= Warszewo =

Neighbourhood of Szczecin, Poland

- Administrative neighbourhood
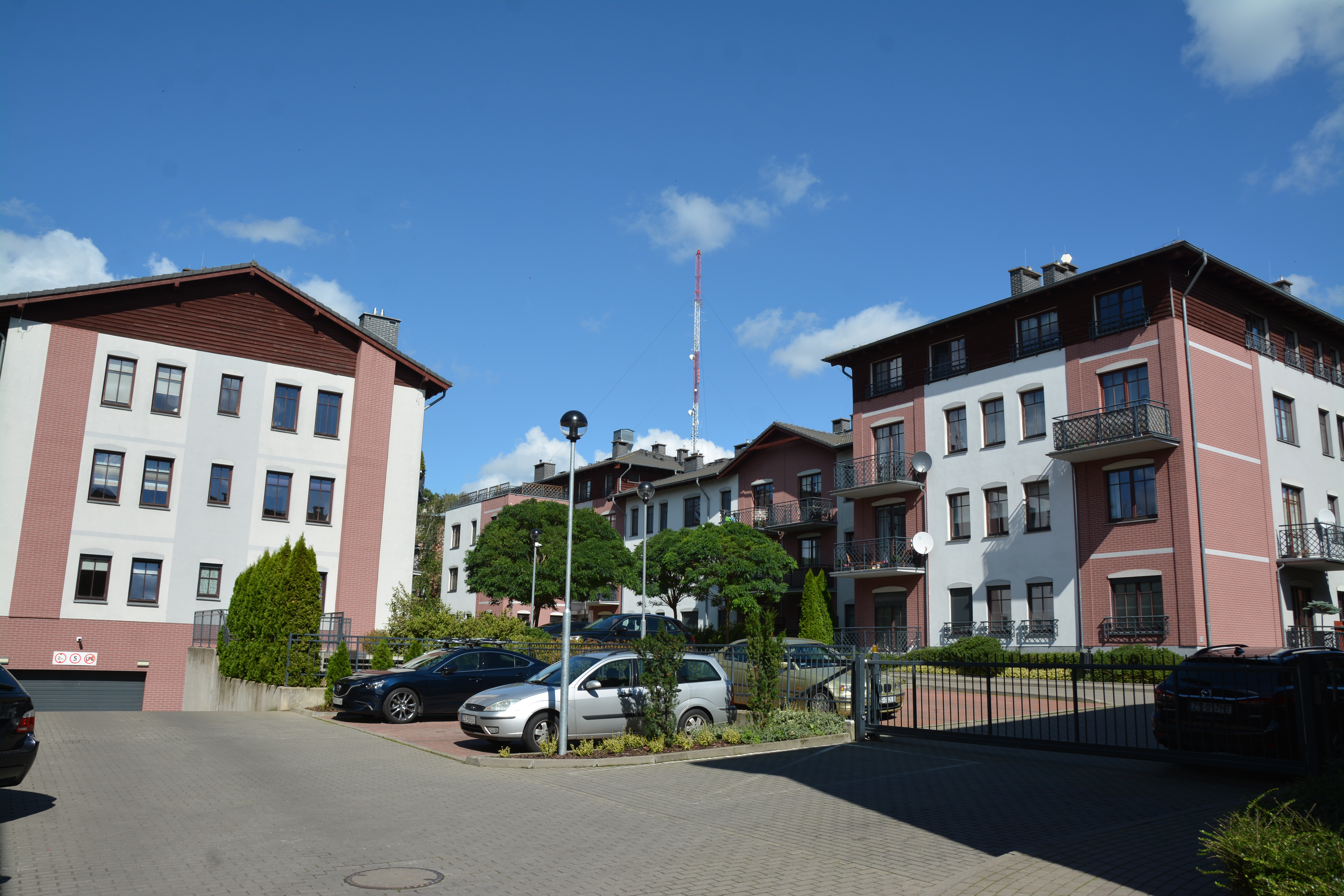
- The apartment buildings in Warszewo.

- Flag Coat of arms

- The location of Warszewo within Szczecin.
- Coordinates: 53°28′27″N 14°32′14″E
- Country: Poland
- Voivodeship: West Pomeranian
- City and county: Szczecin
- District: North

Area
  - Total: 7.3 km^{2} (2.8 sq mi)

Population (2025)
  - Total: 12,416
- Time zone: UTC+1 (CET)
  - Summer (DST): UTC+2 (CEST)
- Area code: +48 91
- Car plates: ZS

Warszewo (Polish: [varˈʂɛ.vɔ]; German until 1945: Warsow [ˈvaɐ̯.zoː]) is an administrative neighbourhood forming a subdivision of the North district in the city of Szczecin, Poland. It is a mixed residential area with low-rise single-family and mid-rise multifamily housing. The neighbourhood has an area of 7.3 km^{2} (2.8 sq mi), and in 2025, was inhabited by 12,416 people. Warszewo also includes the St. Anthony of Padua Church, a Roman Catholic Gothic Revival parish church dating to 1874. Within its boundaries, it also includes the neighbourhoods of Odolany, Podbórz, and Stoki.

Warszewo was most likely founded in the 13th century as a small farming community. In the 18th century, the hamlet of Bukowo was established to its east, and in the 19th century, the hamlets of Podbórz, Stoki, and Sienno were also founded around it. At the turn of the 20th century, Warszewo developed into a suburb, and in the 1920s, the hamlet of Odolany was founded to its south. The area was incorporated into the city of Szczecin in 1939.

== Toponymy ==
The name Warszewo comes from the word Warsz, which is a diminutive form of the Slavic name Warcisław (German: Wartislaw). It was later Germanised into Warsow, and changed to Polish name again in 1945.

The neighbourhood is also the namesake of the Warszewo Hills, a range of moraine hills which cover large portion of the western and northern side of Szczecin.

== History ==
Warszewo (German: Warsow) was most likely founded in the 13th century, in the area of current Miejska, Poznańska, and Szczecińska Streets, as a farming community. It was a small farming community in a shape of a rundling settlement. The oldest known written record of Warszewo comes from 1261, when duke Barnim I, with the permission of Hermann, the bishop of Cammin, dedicated a Roman Catholic church in the village. In 1271, duke Barnim I gifted the ownership of Warszewo, together with 48 voloks (approx. 861 ha) of land to the Cistercian female monastery in Szczecin (Stettin). He reconfirmed it in a document from 1276, and in 1278, he gifted it another 4 voloks (approx. 71 ha) of land in the village, also stating in the document, that Warszewo was already given to it by his father duke Bogislaw II. In 1286, the Bishop of Cammin, Hermann von Gleichen, granted the jurisdiction over the church in Warszewo to the St. Mary Church in Szczecin, which later gave it to the Cistercian monastery in 1289.

Between 1729 and 1732, a water supply pipeline was built, directing water from the sources near Warszewo to the city of Szczecin. It was destroyed in 1813, during the siege laid by the French Grand Army during the War of the Sixth Coalition. In 1779, Warszewo had 15 farms and 2 livestock farms. Between 1824 and 1826, the serfdom was abolished in Warszewo, with the farmlands being granted the lands in a perpetual lease for the price of 3,098 thalers.

In the 18th century, the hamlet of Bukowo (Buchholz) was founded to the east of Warszewo, on the southern side of the Gręziniec stream. Originally used for sheep farming, it pivoted to the farming of the sugar beets in the 19th century, which were sold to a sugar refinery in Drzetowo (Bredow). The same century, the hamlet of Stoki (Rollberg) was also founded to the south of Warszewo, as the property of Bukowo, to also farm sugar beets. In 1825, the hamlet of Nowe Bukowo (lit. 'New Bukowo'; Nue-Buchholz) was founded to the west of Bukowo, which was renamed to Stare Bukowo (lit. 'Old Bukowo'; Alt-Buchholz), to house the employees of a clay quarry and three brickworks which were founded nearby. They produced around 100,000 bricks annually. A clay quarry and six brickworks were also founded in Stoki. In the second half of the 19th century, the estate of Bukowo was subdivided and sold off. Additionally, in the 19th century, the hamlets of Podbórz (Waldschlösschen bei Buchholz) and Sienno (Heuershof) were also founded, being located to the north and east of Warszewo, respectively. In 1862, Warszewo and Nowe Bukowo had 788 and 111 residents respectively.

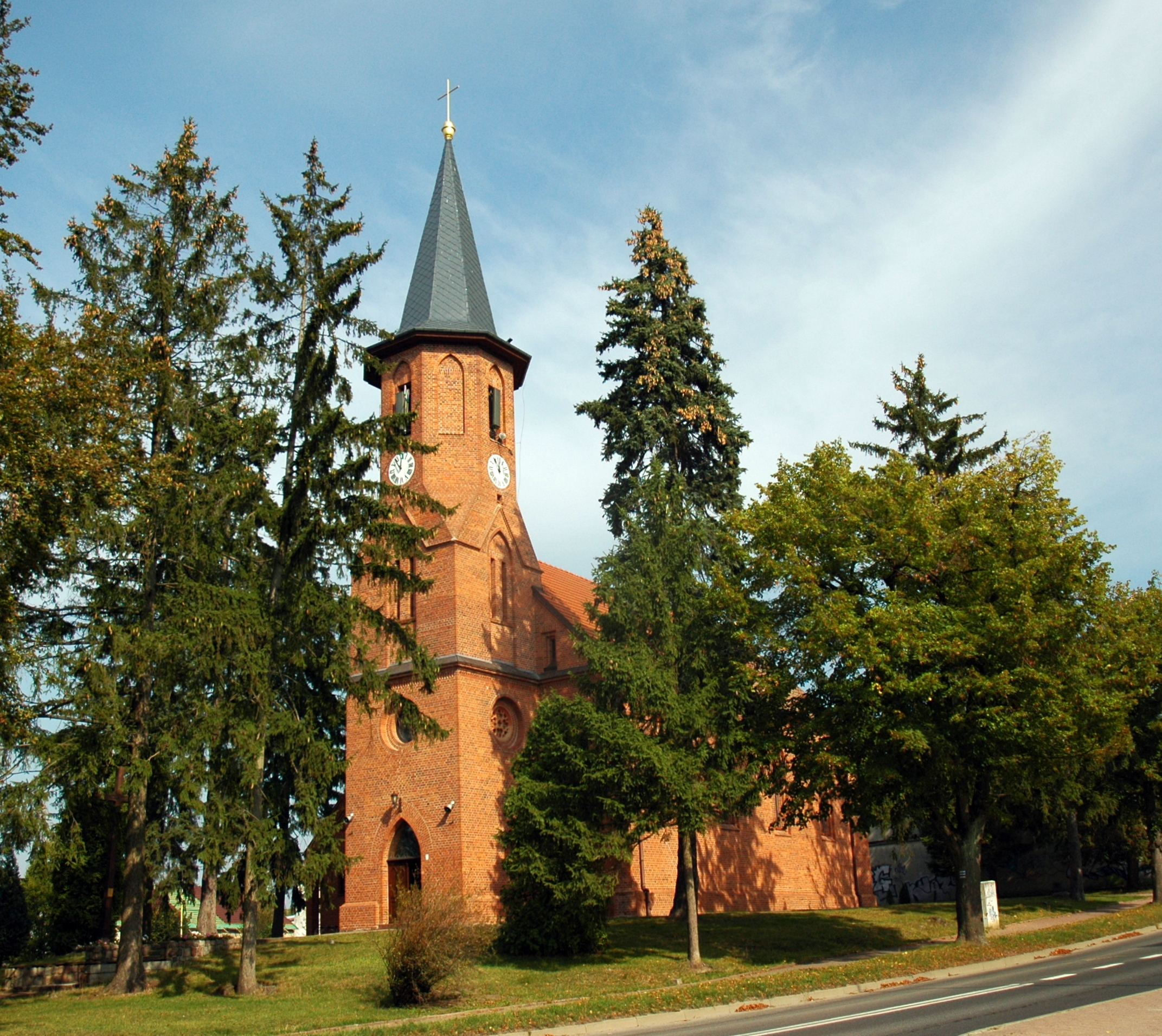
The St. Anthony of Padua Church, built in 1874.

In 1874, the St. Anthony of Padua Church (then known as the Warszewo Village Church) was built at 14 Szczecińska Street in place of the former wooden structure, which was demolished in 1864, due to being in a poor condition. It was designed in the Gothic Revival style and belonged to the Lutheran denomination. In 1945, it was changed to Roman Catholic. Additionally, the churchyard cemetery, which was present next to the building since the 13th century, was also removed around 1864, with new cemetery being opened in 1870 at the corner of the current Duńska, Szczecińska, and Wapienna Streets. It remained in use until 1948. In 2008, the portion of the gravestones were restored and displayed in a lapidarium, with the area of the former cemetery being arranged as a public park.

New housing developments were built in Warszewo at the turn of the 20th century. In 1910, it had 1,200 residents. Between the late 1920s and the early 1930s, the hamlet of Odolany (Wedelshöhe) was founded to the south of Warszewo, as a city suburb with several single-family detached home and villas. Prior to 1939, it had 180 residents. A new housing developments in Warszewo were also in the area of the current Dzierżonia and Perlista Street.

In 1920, a monument dedicated to the seven soldiers from Drzetowo who died during the First World War, was erected in the Ueckermünde Heath to the north of the hamlet. It was created by the Turn- und Sportverein Stettin Bredow v. 1861 e.V. sports club, and dedicated to its seven members who died in the conflict. It had the form of two halves of a large rock with inscriptions on them. In 1945, after the end of the Second World War, the monument was demolished by the Polish government officials, with the rocks being tipped over onto the ground. It was restored in 2008.

In 1934, a concrete sculpture by Kurt Schwerdtfeger, titled The Elephant, was unveiled as the main element of a small fountain at the intersection of the current Poznańska and Szczecińska Streets. The fountain was turned off in the 1960s. Over time, the sculpture, a small statue of an elephant, became widely regarded as the symbol of Warszewo by the local residents.

In the 1930s, a landscape park was developed to the west of Nowe Bukowo, alongside the valley of the Grzęziniec stream, with several small ponds being formed by damming its portion. The park also included complex of fountains and a small bridge, and with avenues surrounded by hornbeam trees. In 1936, a large granite rock, with the height of 2.7 m and width of 6.8 m, was placed to the south of Nowe Bukowo to commemorate the creation of the park, being colloquially referred to as the Bukowo Rock.

On 15 October 1939, the area of Warszewo and surrounding settlements was incorporated into the city of Szczecin. At the time Warszewo had 3340 residents. During the Second World War, a forced labour camp operated in Odolany, imprisoning Polish inmates deported from the occupied Poland. In 1944, several bombs fell on buildings in Warszewo, however they did not cause much destruction. The city was captured by the Red Army of the Soviet Union on 26 April 1945. It was placed under the Polish administration on 5 July 1945, while its suburbs, including Warszewo were placed under military Soviet occupation. The neighbourhood was reincorporated into the city administration on 4 October 1945. Following the end of the conflict, the German population either fled or was expelled from Szczecin, and was replaced by Polish settlers. The hamlets of Nowe Bukowo, Stare Bukowo, and Podbórz were abandoned, with their buildings being later dismantled for their bricks, which were used in other construction projects in the city. The only remaining structures in the area of Bukowo were several artefacts left from the landscape park alongside the Gręziniec stream, and the Bukowo Rock. Afterwards, the new housing of the neighbourhood of Bukowo was developed to the north of the stream.

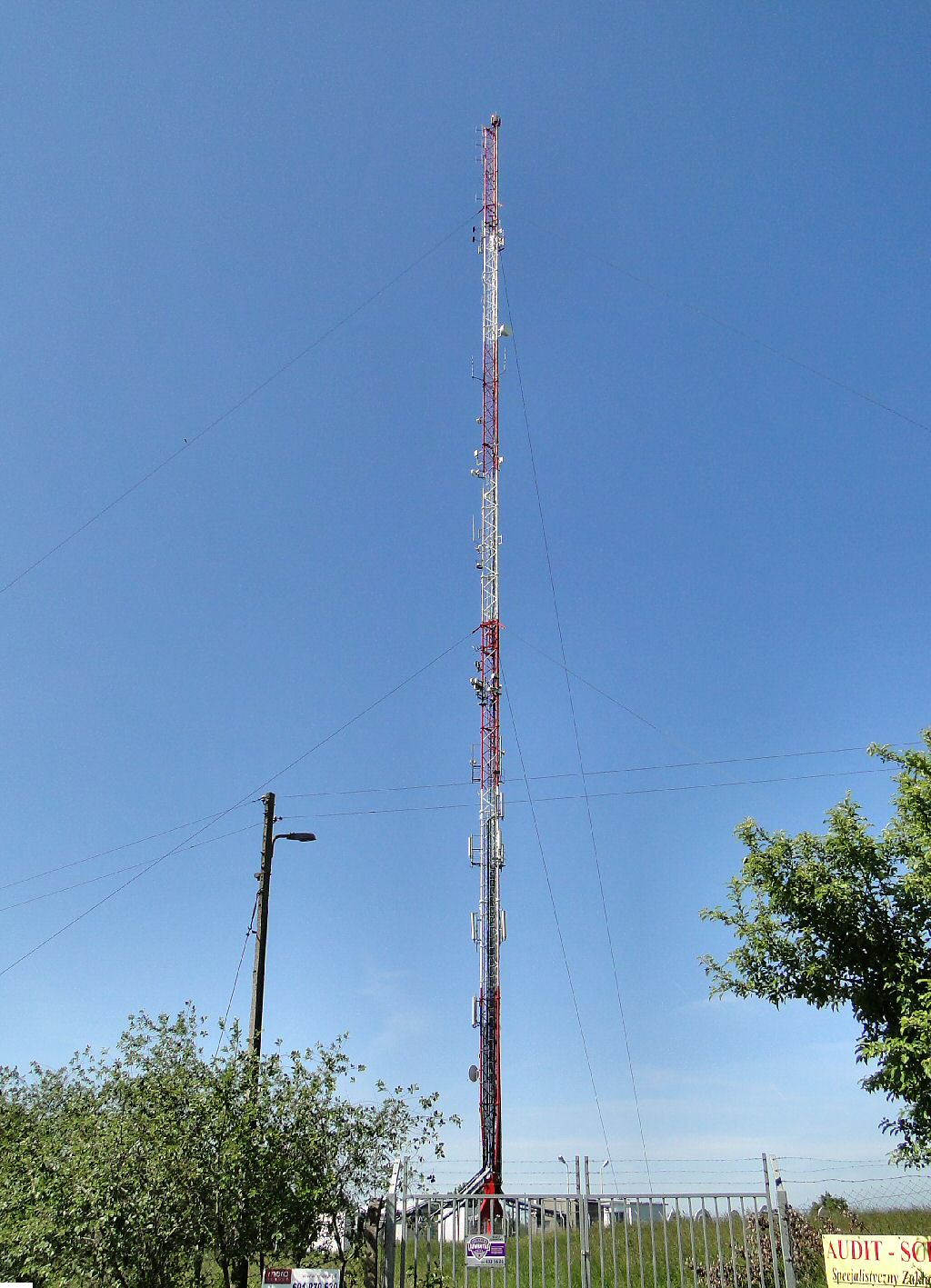
The mast of the Warszewo Radio Broadcasting Station with the height of 114 m, built in 1949.

In 1949, the Warszewo Radio Broadcasting Station was opened near Podbórzańska Street, with a radio mast with the height of 114 m.

In the 1960s, new housing developments were built in Odolany.

From 1955 to 1976, the neighbourhood of Warszewo, formed one of the administrative subdivisions of the Nad Odrą district. In 1960, it had the population of 2,214 people. On 28 November 1990, the neighbourhood of Warszewo was established as one of the administrative subdivisions of the West district, being governed by an elected neighbourhood council. It also included the neighbourhoods of Odolany, and Podbórz, and the northern side of Stoki, as well as the areas of the former settlements of Nowe Bukowo and Stare Bukowo. The neighbourhood of Bukowo became its own administrative subdivision, with its boundary with Warszewo being marked by the Gręziniec stream. Additionally, the neighbourhood of Sienno, historically associated with Warszewo, became part of the subdivision of Żelechowa instead.

New single- and multifamily housing developments begun being constructed across Warszewo in the second half of the 1990s, and continues throughout the first quarter of the 21st century.

== Characteristics ==
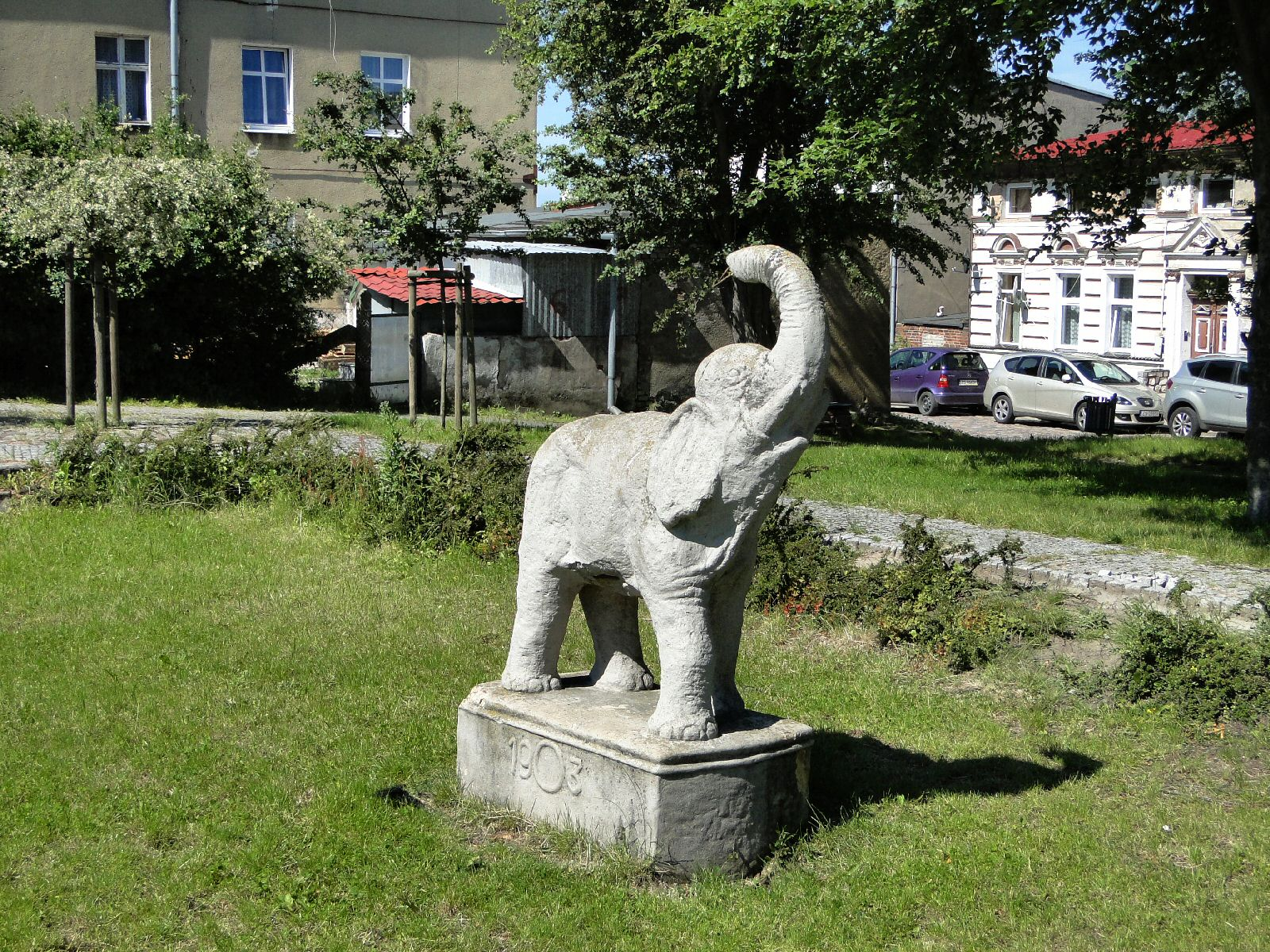
The 1934 sculpture by Kurt Schwerdtfeger, titled The Elephant, widely considered as a symbol of Warszewo.

Warszewo is a mixed residential neighbourhood with numerous low-rise single-family and mid-rise multifamily housing estates. It also includes smaller neighbourhoods of Podbórz in the north, and Stoki and Odolany in the south. It includes the St. Anthony of Padua Church, a Roman Catholic Gothic Revival parish church dating to 1874, and located at 14 Szczecińska Street. A lapidarium being a reminder from a former cemetery dating to 1870, is located nearby, at the corner of Duńska, Szczecińska, and Wapienna Streets. The neighbourhood also includes the Warszewo Radio Broadcasting Station near Podbórzańska Street, with a radio mast with the height of 114 m.

The neighbourhood is placed on the Warszewo Hills. In the northeast, the neighbourhood features undeveloped field with a few clay pit ponds. In the north, it is covered by a portion of the Ueckermünde Heath, as well as the Wodozbiór conservation area, with water sources of the Gręziniec stream, which forms the southern border of the neighbourhood, as well as the Sienniczka stream which crosses through Warszewo. In the west, the neighbourhood is also crossed though by Warszewiec and Bystry Rów streams, and includes a few small ponds, including the Black Pond, Desolation Pond, and Sycamore Maple Pond.

The neighbourhood includes the 1934 sculpture by Kurt Schwerdtfeger, titled The Elephant, placed at the corner of Poznańska and Szczecińska Streets. It has a form of a small concrete statue of an elephant, and is widely considered as a symbol of Warszewo. In the north within Ueckermünde Heath, the neighbourhood also includes a monument from 1920 dedicated to the seven soldiers from Drzetowo who died during the First World War, placed on Podbórzańska Street. Additionally, a large granite rock, colloquially known as the Bukowo Rock, is placed near the Grzęziniec stream. It has the height of 2.7 m and width of 6.8 m, and bears an inscription with the quote by playwright Friedrich Schiller. It was placed in 1936, to commemorate the creation of a landscape park alongside the stream in the 1930s, which was later demolished after 1945.

== Demographics ==
Historical population
Year	2008	2009	2010	2011	2012	2013	2014	2015	2016	2017	2018	2019	2020	2021	2025
Pop.	6,197	6,595	6,979	7,409	8,042	8,584	9,044	9,421	9,857	10,288	10,616	10,938	11,282	11,432	12,416
±%	—	+6.4%	+5.8%	+6.2%	+8.5%	+6.7%	+5.4%	+4.2%	+4.6%	+4.4%	+3.2%	+3.0%	+3.1%	+1.3%	+8.6%

== Symbols ==
The coat of arms of Warszewo bears two white (silver) crescents, placed in a row, both facing with its insides outward, in the opposite directions to eatchother, and a white (silver) cross potent centered above them, being half their size. They area placed on a blue background within an Iberian-style escutcheon, in a form of a shield with wider top and thinner bottom, and white border. The two crescents symbolise the Order of Cistercians which owned Warszewo in the Middle Ages, while the cross above them symbolises the Catholic Church. The blue and white colours reference the flag the Province of Pomerania, used from 1882 to 1935. The flag of Warszewo is a wide rectangle with the proportions of 1:2, and has a form of a banner of arms, with two white crescents and the cross potent, placed on a blue background. Both symbols were designed by Radosław Porwich. The coat of arms was created in 2004, while the flag was adopted in 2011.

== Government and boundaries ==
Warszewo is one of the administrative neighbourhoods forming a subdivision of the North district in the city of Szczecin, Poland. It is governed by a locally elected neighbourhood council with 15 members. Its headquarters are located at 7 Poznańska Street. Its boundaries are approximately determined by the Gręziniec stream, Wkrzańska Street, Królewskiego Street, Księcia Warcisława I Street, the Sienniczka strea, Włoska Street, the Bystry Rów stream, Duńska Street, the buildings on Kostrzewskiego and Dzierżonia Streets, the Warszewiec stream, Północna Street, Andersena Street, the buildings on Królowej Śniegu and Karkonoska Streets, Podbórzańska Street, and the city boundary. Warszewo borders the neighbourhoods of Arkońskie-Niemierzyn, Bukowo, Golęcino-Gocław, Niebuszewo, Osów, and Żelechowa, and the municipality of Police in Police County. The neighbourhood has the total area of 7.3 km^{2} (2.8 sq mi).
