= Brodów Park =

Urban park in Szczecin, Poland

- The Brodów Park in 2013.
- Interactive map of Brodów Park
- Type: Urban park
- Location: Szczecin, Poland
- Coordinates: 53°27′38.35″N 14°33′54.31″E
- Area: c. 10 ha (24.71 acres)
- Created: 1970s

The Brodów Park (Polish pronunciation: [ˈbrɔ.duf]; Polish: Park Brodowski) is an urban park in the city of Szczecin, Poland. It is located the neighbourhood of Żelechowa within the North district, between Obotrycka, Pochyła, Pochyła, Ułańska, Żurawia, Axentowicza, Liściasta, and Słowicza Streets. It was originally created as the Drzetowo Cemetery (Polish pronunciation: [dʐɛˈtɔ.vɔ]; Polish: Cmentarz Drzetowski; German: Bredower Friedhof), a Lutheran burial ground serving the nearby village of Drzetowo (now a neighbourhood in Szczecin). It was closed around 1949, with the gravestones being removed throughout the 1950s and 1960s. It was redeveloped into an urban park in the first half of the 1970s.

== Toponymy ==
The park was named after the former Polish-language name of the neighbourhood of Drzetowo, which was Brodów, briefly used between 1945 and 1946, being related to the former German-language name Bredow, used prior to 1945.

== History ==
The Our Lady of the Sharp Gate Church in Brodów Park, built in 1892 as a cemetery chapel of the Drzetowo Cemetery.

In the 19th century, the Drzetowo Cemetery (Polish: Cmentarz Drzetowski; German: Bredower Friedhof) was established in the area between the current Obotrycka and Słowicza Streets, measuring around 3.5 ha (8.64 ha). It served as a Lutheran burial ground for the residents of the village of Drzetowo (now a neighbourhood in Szczecin). In 1892, a Lutheran cemetery chapel was built on the current Słowicza Street. Due to lack of space, the last burials in the area took place around 1901. In 1905, the cemetery have been expanded, with 7.5 ha (18.53 acres) of land being acquired from the village of Niebuszewo in 1904. It was located between the current Axentowicza, Liściasta, Słowicza, and Żurawia Streets. The same year, to connect both sides of the cemetery, a small brige was built crossing a creek near the cemetery chapel.

The cemetery have been devastated by the Allies aerial bombings during the Second World War. The cemetery was closed around 1949, with the gravestones being removed from it throughout the 1950s and 1960s. In the first half of the 1970s, the area have been redeveloped into an urban park measuring around 10 ha (24.71 acres), being named the Brodów Park. It was further developed in the 1990s, and later renovated in 2018.

On 1 December 1945, the cemetery chapel was consecrated as a Roman Catholic church of the Parish of Our Lady of Perpetual Help. It was named the Our Lady of the Sharp Gate Church. In 1951, it became the main temple of the Parish Our Lady of the Sharp Gate. On 6 September 2014, a commemorative plaque was unveiled at the church, being dedicated to the people buried at the former cemetery.

== Characteristics ==
The Brodów Park has a total area of around 10 ha (24.71 acres), and is placed on the Warszewo Hills between Obotrycka, Pochyła, Pochyła, Ułańska, Żurawia, Axentowicza, Liściasta, and Słowicza Streets. It includes the Our Lady of the Sharp Gate Church, a Roman Catholic parish church dating to 1892, placed on Słowicza Street.

Among the tree species present in the park are: bald cypress, black cherry, black cottonwood, Dunkeld larch, European ash, European beech, European hornbeam, European larch, European yew, field maple, horse chestnut, Kentucky coffeetree, Kentucky yellowwood, large-leaved linden, Lawson's cypress, London plane, pedunculate oak, northern red oak, northern white-cedar, Norway maple, Norway spruce, rowan, sessile oak, silver birch, silver poplar, small-leaved lime, Swedish whitebeam, sycamore, white willow, wild service tree, and wych elm. The park also includes several trees with a status of the natural monument. They are a horse chestnut, a large-leaved lime, a northern red oak, a Norway maple, a pedunculate oak, a sessile oak, a small-leaved lime, and a wild service tree. The park is also crossed by a small creek.
