= Stoki, Szczecin =

Neighbourhood of Szczecin, Poland

Stoki
- Neighbourhood
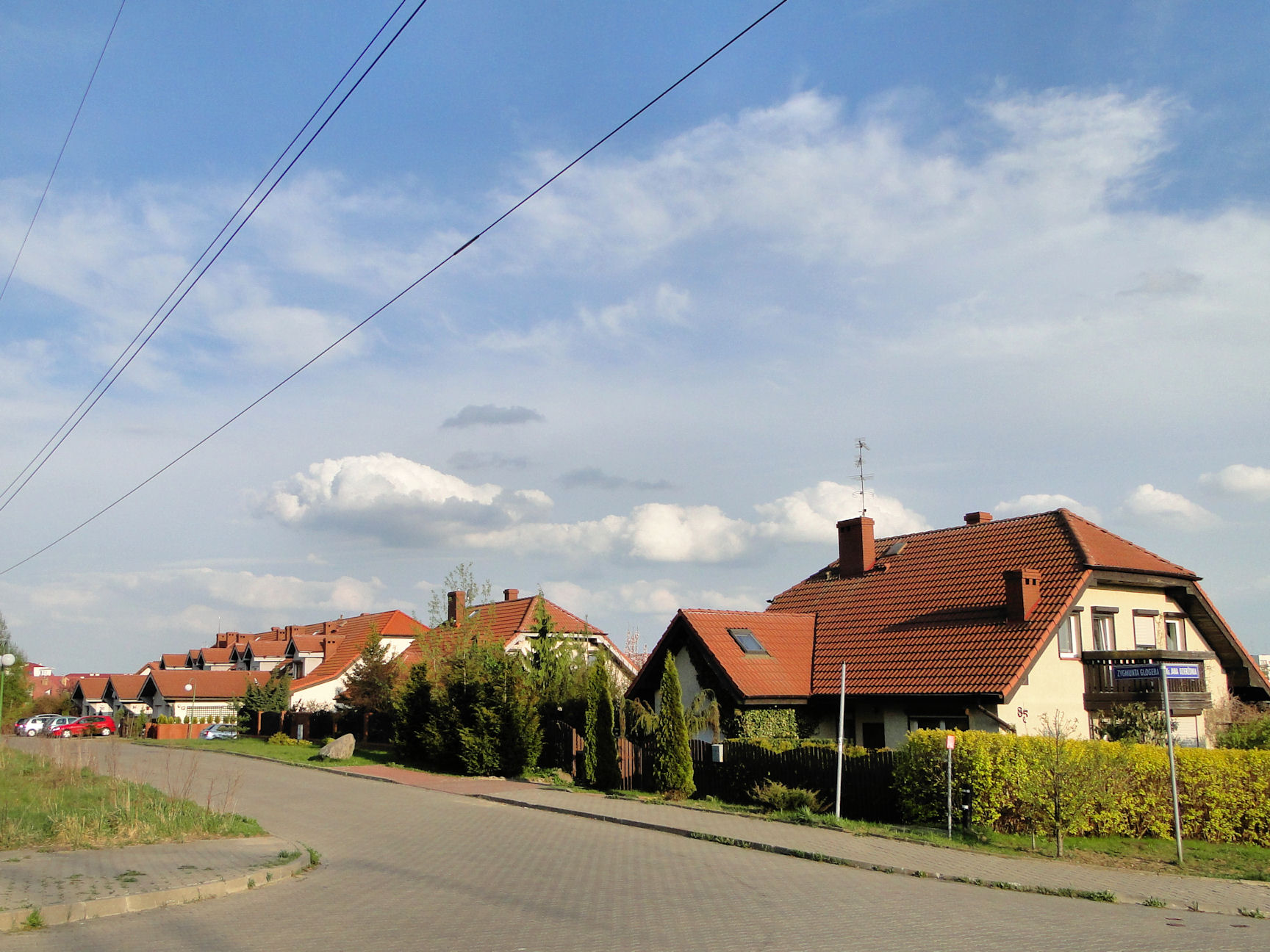
- Houses in Stoki.
- Interactive map of Stoki
- Coordinates: 53.462389°N 14.536417°E
- Country: Poland
- Voivodeship: West Pomeranian
- City and county: Szczecin
- Districts: North; West
- Administrative neighbourhoods: Arkońskie-Niemierzyn; Warszewo
- Time zone: UTC+1 (CET)
  - Summer (DST): UTC+2 (CEST)
- Area code: +48 91
- Car plates: ZS

Stoki (Polish: [ˈstɔ.ki]; German until 1945: Rollberg [ˈʁɔlˌbɛɐ̯k]) is a neighbourhood of Szczecin, Poland. It is administratively divided between the neighbourhoods of Arkońskie-Niemierzyn in the south, and Warszewo in the north, located within the West and North districts, respectively. It is a mixed residential area with low-rise single-family and mid-rise multifamily housing. Stoki were founded in the 19th century as a small farming community, and incorporated into the city in 1939. In the 1980s, a housing estate with apartment buildings was constructed in the neighbourhood. It was expanded at the beginning of the 21st century with new housing developments.

== Toponomy ==
The name Stoki translates in Polish to mean slopes, referring to its placement on the Warszewo Hills. Prior to 1945, it was known by the German name Rollberg, which comes from words rollen, meaning to roll, and Berg, meaning a mountain.

== History ==
In the 19th century, the area of the hamlet of Stoki was part of the farming estate of Babelsdorf-Buchholz, centered on the hamlet of Bukowo. It used to farm sugar beet, which were sold to a sugar refinery in Drzetowo. At the end of the century, clay begun being mined in the area, with a brickworks being founded in Stoki in 1896. By 1914, there were six brickworks in the area. On 15 October 1939, the area, including Stoki, was incorporated into the city of Szczecin. Following the end of the Second World War, the city was placed under Polish administration, with the German population either fleeing or being expelled from Szczecin and being replaced with Polish settlers.

In 1955, the area of Stoki was divided between two administrative subdivisions, Niemierzyn in the south, and Warszewo in the north, located within the districts of Pogodno and Nad Odrą respectively. The subdivisions were abolished in 1976. The neighbourhood was again divided in 1990, with the establishment of subdivisions of Arkońskie-Niemierzyn in the south, and Warszewo in the north, being part of the West and North districts, respectively.

In the 1980s, a housing estate with several 5-storey apartment buildings was developed in the south of Stoki, in the area of Wiosny Ludów Street. At the beginning of the 21st century, the single-family housing was developed in the north of Stoki, including in the area of Glogera and Wieczorowskiego Streets. Between 1999 and 2007, a housing estate of Warszewo Stoki was developed in the north, with nineteen 4-storey apartment buildings on Duńska, Złotowska, and Kostrzewskiego Streets.

== Characteristics ==
Stoki is a mixed residential area with low-rise single-family and mid-rise multifamily housing, placed on the Warszewo Hills. It includes housing estates with apartment buildings in the area of Wiosny Ludów Street in the south, and Duńska, Złotowska, and Kostrzewskiego Streets in the north, as well as low-rise single-family housing on Glogera and Wieczorowskiego Streets.
