= Podbórz, Szczecin =

Neighbourhood of Szczecin, Poland

Podbórz
- Neighbourhood
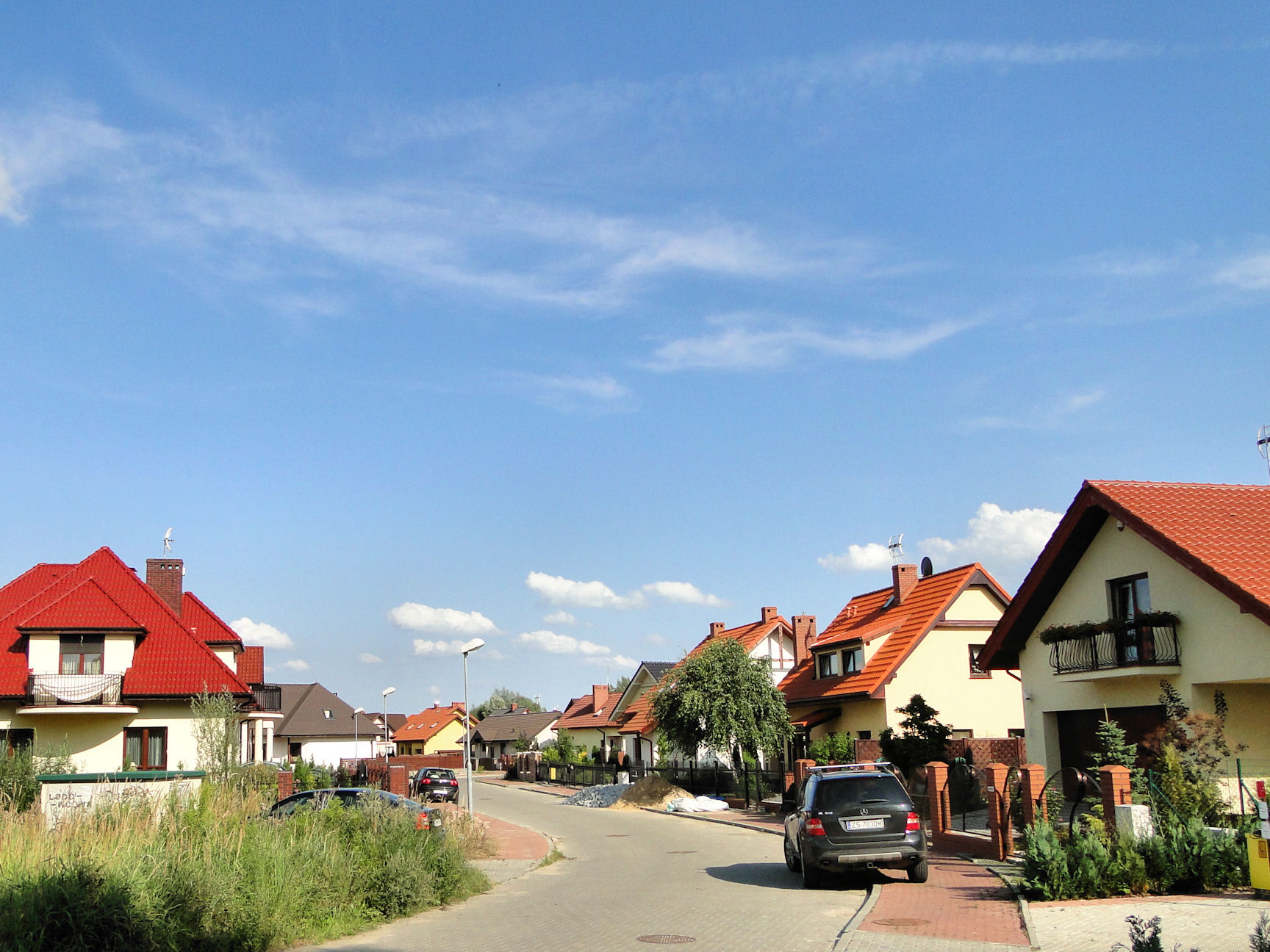
- Houses in Podbórz.
- Interactive map of Podbórz
- Coordinates: 53.483320°N 14.543281°E
- Country: Poland
- Voivodeship: West Pomeranian
- City and county: Szczecin
- District: North
- Administrative neighbourhood: Warszewo
- Time zone: UTC+1 (CET)
  - Summer (DST): UTC+2 (CEST)
- Area code: +48 91
- Car plates: ZS

Podbórz (Polish: [ˈpɔd.buʂ]; German until 1945: Waldschlösschen bei Buchholz [ˈvalt.ˌʃlœs.çən baɪ̯ ˈbuːxˌhɔlts]) is a neighbourhood of Szczecin, Poland, located within the North district, in the northern portion of the administrative subdivision of Warszewo. It is a low-rise housing area with single-family detached and semi-detached homes. Podbórz was founded in the 19th century, and incorporated into the city in 1939.

== Toponomy ==
The name Podbórz comes from Polish words "pod borem", meaning "near the forest". It comes from the name of its neighbourhood's main street, Podbórzańska Street (Polish: Ulica Podbórzańska; lit. 'street near the forest'), which crosses though the Ueckermünde Heath in the north. Prior to 1945, it was known in German as Waldstraße, meaning Forest Street. Before 1945, the neighbourhood was also known in German as Waldschlösschen bei Buchholz. The term Waldschlösschen translates to mean the "little forest castle", and was originally a name of the restaurant founded in the area in the 19th century. "Buchholz" was a name for the nearby hamlet, now known as Bukowo, and directly translates to mean "beech wood", being named after the beech trees in the area. The name Waldschlösschen bei Buchholz translated to mean Little Forest Castle near Buchholz.

== History ==
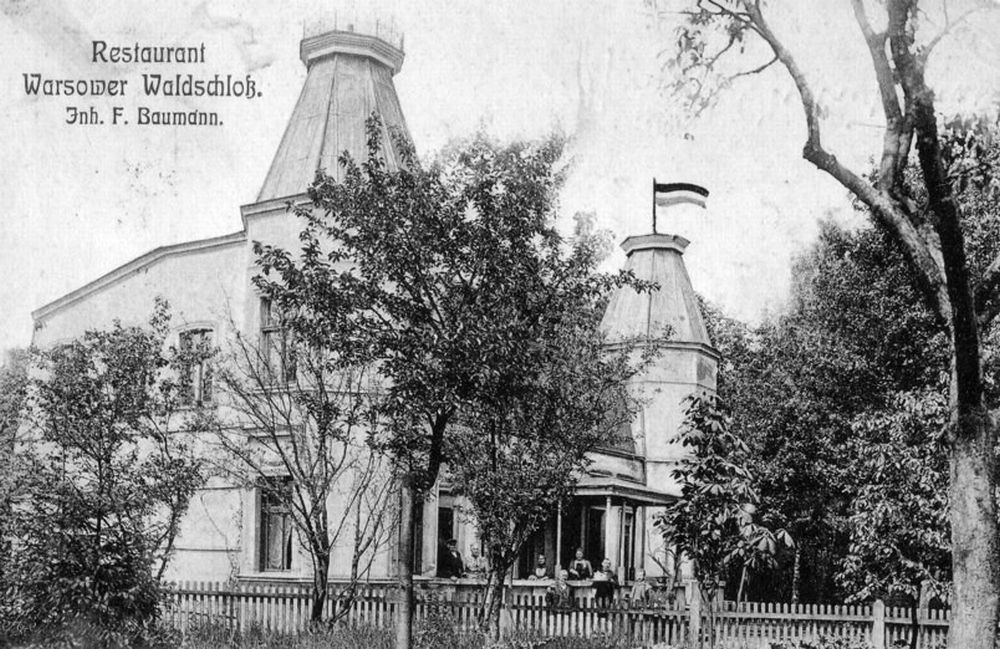
The Waldschlösschen restaurant in Podbórz in 1915.

Prior to the creation of the neighbourhood, a forester's lodge was present in its area, placed on the current Podbórzańska Street within the Ueckermünde Heath. In the 19th century it was demolished, and replaced with a restaurant named Waldschlösschen (lit. 'Little Forest Castle'; also known as Warsower Waldschloss, lit. 'Warszewo Forest Castle'). In the 1920s, a building located in front of it was turned into an orphanage. Overtime, a hamlet developed around the restaurant building, named Waldschlösschen bei Buchholz. Prior to the outbreak of the Second World War in 1939, it had 51 residents, living in 10 households.

In 1920, a monument dedicated to the seven soldiers from Drzetowo who died during the First World War, was erected in the Ueckermünde Heath to the north of the hamlet. It was created by the Turn- und Sportverein Stettin Bredow v. 1861 e.V. sports club, and dedicated to its seven members who died in the conflict. It had the form of two halves of a large rock with inscriptions on them. In 1945, after the end of the Second World War, the monument was demolished by the Polish government officials, with the rocks being tipped over onto the ground. It was restored in 2008.

On 15 October 1939, the area was incorporated into the city of Szczecin. Following the end of the Second World War in 1945, the city was placed under Polish administration, with the German population either fleeing or being expelled from Szczecin and being replaced with Polish settlers. The neighbourhood was abandoned and its buildings demolished years later. Some of the foundations and basements survive to the present day.

At the beginning of the 21st century, a housing estate, known unofficially as Lisie Pole (lit. 'Fox Field') was developed to the south of the historic location of Podbórz, in the area of Podbórzańska, Dolomitów, Kaskadowa, and Morenowa Street. It consists of around 70 single-family detached homes, and covers area of around 15 ha. Beginning in 2008, new houses were also built in the area.

== Characteristics ==
Podbórz is a low-rise housing area with single-family detached and semi-detached homes. It includes a housing estate known unofficially as Lisie Pole, which covers an area of around 15 ha, and includes around 70 houses. To its north, the area is covered by the Ueckermünde Heath. The monument dedicated to the seven soldiers from Drzetowo who died during the First World War, erected in 1920, is placed in the forest.
