= Bukowo =

Neighbourhood of Szczecin, Poland

- Administrative neighbourhood
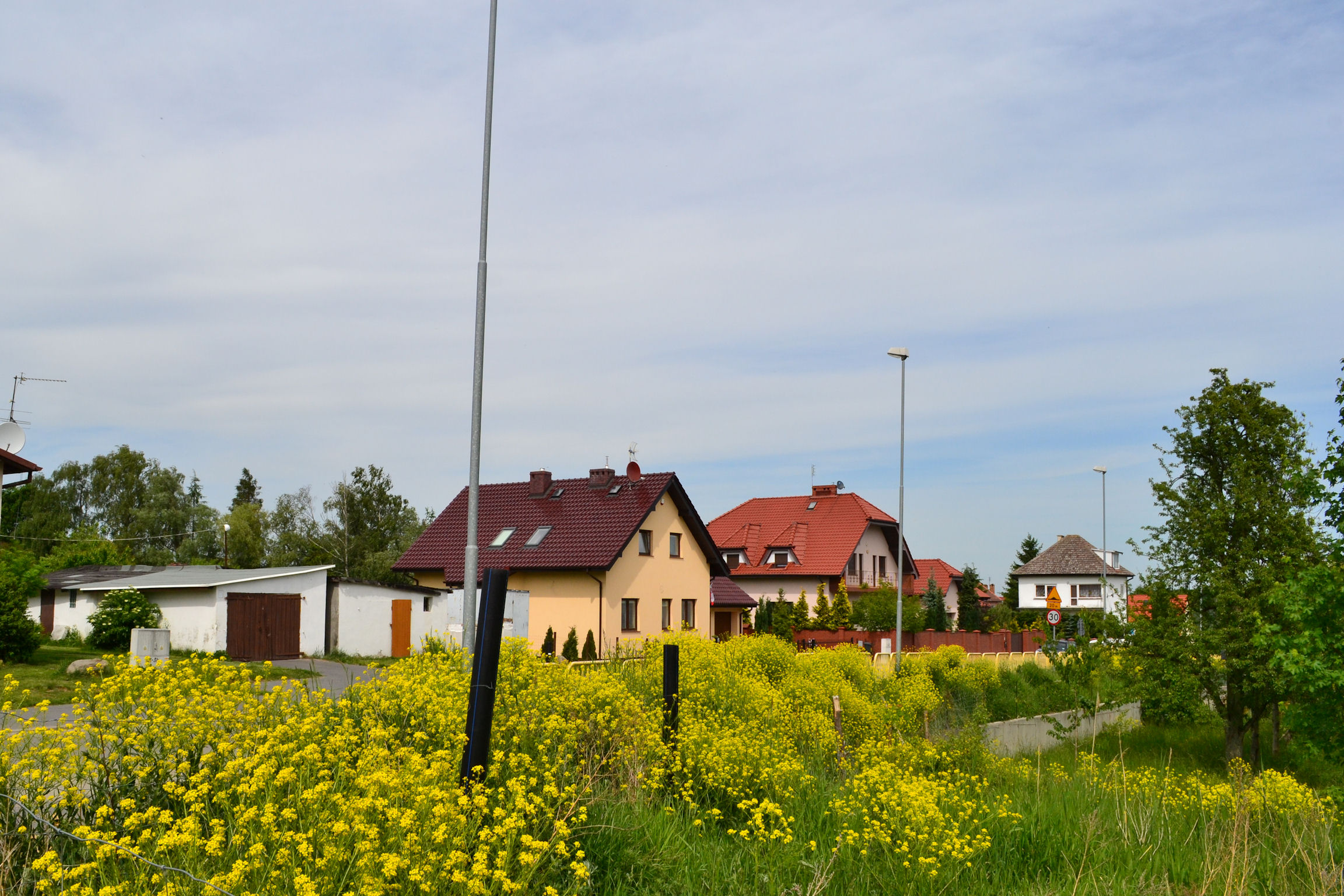
- Houses in Bukowo.

- The location of Bukowo within Szczecin.
- Coordinates: 53°28′59″N 14°35′05″E
- Country: Poland
- Voivodeship: West Pomeranian
- City and county: Szczecin
- District: North

Area
  - Total: 4.8 km^{2} (1.9 sq mi)

Population (2025)
  - Total: 4,828
- Time zone: UTC+1 (CET)
  - Summer (DST): UTC+2 (CEST)
- Area code: +48 91
- Car plates: ZS

Bukowo (Polish: [buˈkɔ.vɔ]; German until 1945: Buchholz [ˈbuːxˌhɔlts]) is an administrative neighbourhood forming a subdivision of the North district in the city of Szczecin, Poland. It is a residential area with low-rise single-family housing. The neighbourhood has an area of 4.8 km^{2} (1.9 sq mi), and in 2025, was inhabited by 4,828 people. Bukowo also includes the Gocław Tower, a Romanesque Revival observation tower dating to 1921, with the height of 25 m. The area also includes two conservation areas, Kupala Forest, and Wodozbiór, which form parts of the Ueckermünde Heath.

The hamlet of Bukowo was founded in the 18th century, and in 1825, a hamlet of Stare Bukowo was founded to its west. Throughout the 1920s and 1930s, two housing estates were developed to their east, as expansion of the village of Stołczyn. The area was incorporated into the city of Szczecin in 1939. After in 1945, the original developments of Bukowo were abandoned and demolished, with new houses being built to their north.

== Toponomy ==
The name Bukowo comes from Polish word buk meaning a beech tree, with conjunction of suffix -owo, which forms nouns denoting places. It is a calque of the former German name of the neighbourhood, Buchholz, which translates directly to mean "beech wood". It came from the fact, that the area used to be covered by a small beech forest when the settlement was first founded in the 18th century.

== History ==
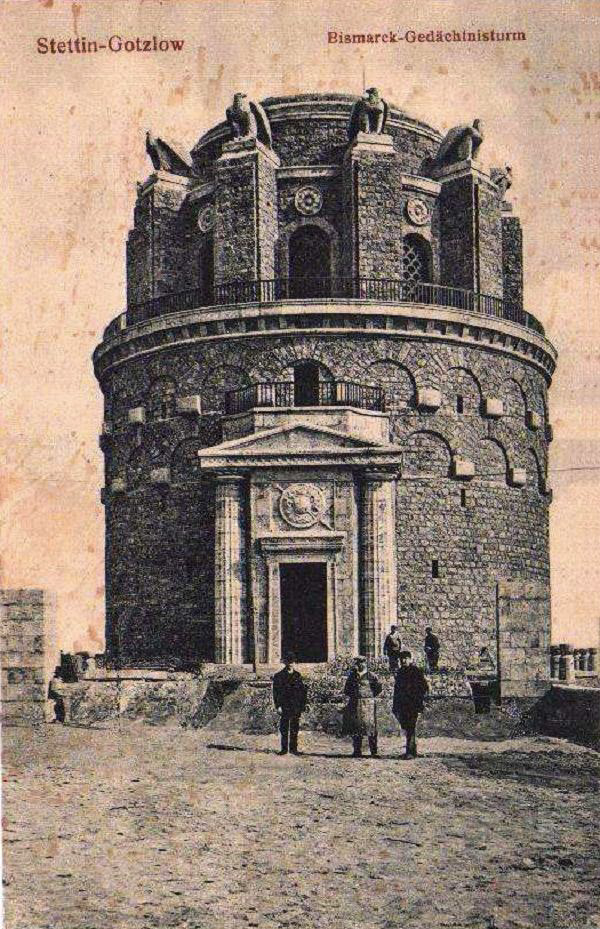
The Gocław Tower built in 1921, to the east of Bukowo.

The hamlet of Bukowo (German: Buchholz) was founded in the 18th century by Winkelmann, a councilor from the city of Szczecin. Originally, it was used for sheep farming. The hamlet was built in a beech forest, on the southern side of the Gręziniec stream. In the 19th century, after the forest was cut down, the settlement pivoted to farming sugar beets, which were sold to a sugar refinery in Drzetowo. It became part of the farming estate of Babelsdorf-Buchholz. In 1825, another hamlet, originally named Nowa Kolonia (lit. 'New Colony'; German: Neu-Kolonie) was founded to the west of Bukowo, for the employees of a clay quarry and three brickworks which were founded nearby. They produced around 100,000 bricks annually. In the second half of the 19th century, the estate of Babelsdorf-Buchholz was subdivided and sold to merchants Schleich, Ladewig, and Wellmann. Following the expansion of Nowa Kolonia, it was renamed to Nowe Bukowo (lit. 'New Bukowo'; German: Neu-Buchholz), while the older settlement became known Stare Bukowo (lit. 'Old Bukowo'; German: Alt-Buchholz). The estate was subdivided and sold to merchants Schleich, Ladewig, and Wellmann in the second half of the 19th century. In 1862, Nowe Bukowo had 111 inhabitants, while in 1885, Stare Bukowo had 20 residents, with an estate of 416 Magdeburg morgen (106.21 ha), of which 350 morgen (89.36) were dedicated to farmland.

Between 1914 and 1921, the Gocław Tower, originally known as the Bismarck Tower, was built on the Green Hill in Kupala Forest, to the east of Bukowo and Gocław, near the Oder river. It was designed by Wilhelm Kreis in a Romanesque Revival style, as part of the Bismarck towers, a series of observation towers dedicated in commemoration to Otto von Bismarck, a statesman and diplomat who oversaw the unification of Germany and served as its first chancellor from 1871 to 1890. It had a total height of 25 m.

In the late 1920s, a housing estate of Randsiedlung (lit. 'peripheral settlement') was built in the area of current Ludgardy, Kolonistów, Do Dworu Streets as an extension of the neighbourhood of Stołczyn. In the 1930s, a housing estate of Nockshöhe, in the area of the current intersection of the Szosy Polskiej and Ostoi-Zagórskiego Streets. Both neighbourhoods consisted of single-family detached and semi-detached homes, and became together known as Stołczyn Zachodni (German: West-Stolzenhagen).

In the 1930s, a landscape park was developed to the west of Nowe Bukowo, alongside the valley of the Grzęziniec stream, with several small ponds being formed by damming its portion. The park also included complex of fountains and a small bridge, and with avenues surrounded by hornbeam trees. In 1936, a large granite rock, with the height of 2.7 m and width of 6.8 m, was placed to the south of Nowe Bukowo to commemorate the creation of the park, being colloquially referred to as the Bukowo Rock.

On 15 October 1939, the area, including Nowe Bukowo, Stare Bukowo, and Stołczyn was incorporated into the city of Szczecin. At the time, Nowe Bukowo had 95 residents. Following the end of the Second World War in 1945, the city was placed under Polish administration, with the German population either fleeing or being expelled from Szczecin and being replaced with Polish settlers. All of the buildings in the neighbourhoods of Nowe Bukowo and Stare Bukowo were dismantled for their bricks, which were used in other construction projects in the city. The only remaining structures in the area were several artefacts left from the landscape park alongside the Gręziniec stream, and the Bukowo Rock. Afterwards, the new housing of the neighbourhood of Bukowo was developed to the north of the stream, being conjoined with Stołczyn Zachodni.

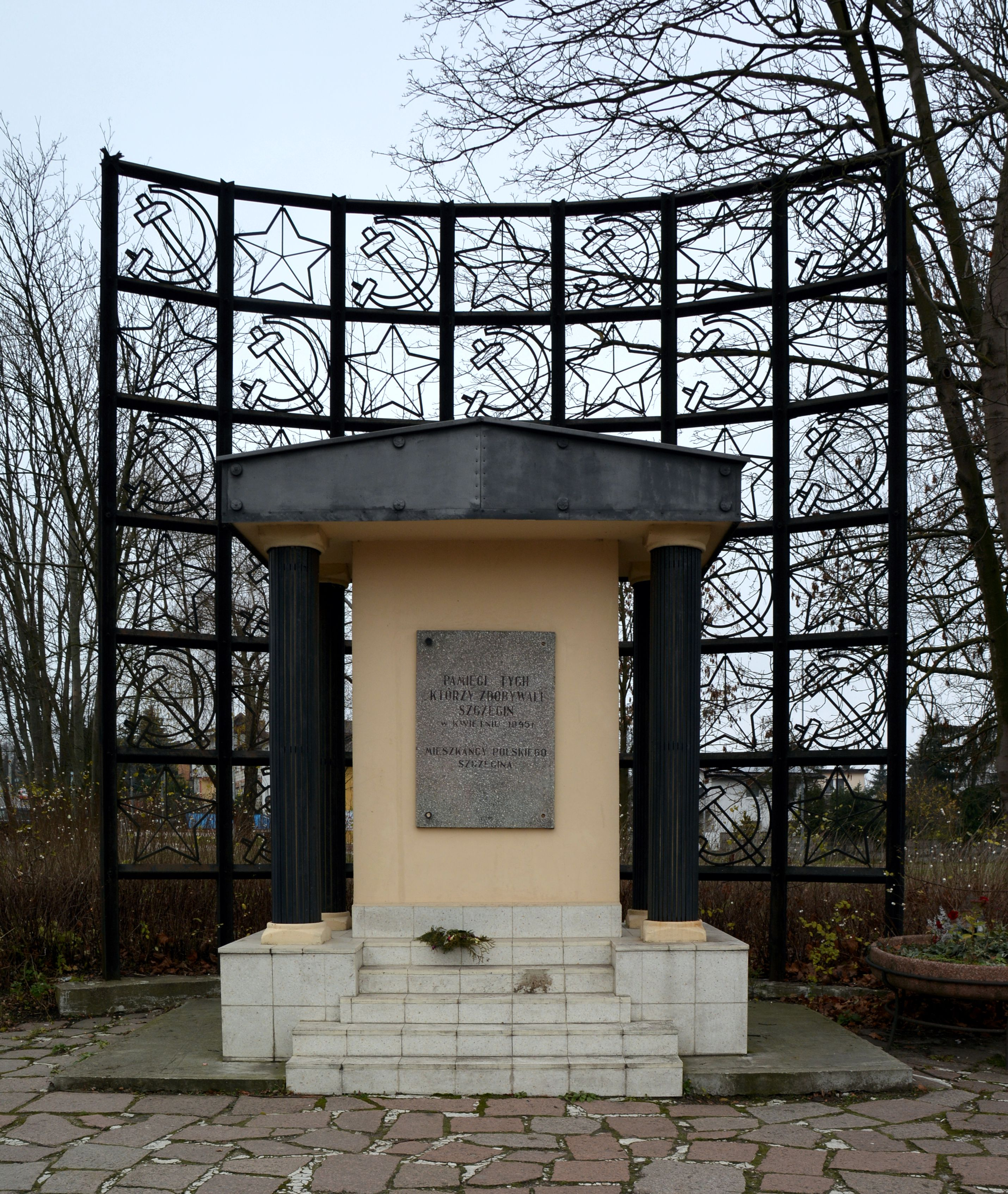
The Memorial to the Glory of the Red Army, built between 1974 and 1975, and removed in 2018.

In 1945, the Memorial to the Glory of the Red Army, was placed at the corner of Nehringa and Szosa Polska Streets in Bukowo. It was dedicated to the soldiers of the 2nd Belorussian Front of the Red Army, including the 2nd Shock Army, which participated in the capture of the northern regions of Szczecin during the Second World War in April 1945. It originally had a form of an obelisk with a commemorative plaque. Sometime between 1974 and 1975, it was replaced with a new monument. It had a form of a stone commemorative plaque on a wall, with a roof supported by fluted columns, and with metal grid with 49 square fields, featuring alternating shapes of hammer, sickle, and star, the symbols of the Soviet Union. The monument was removed in 2018.

From 1955 to 1976, the area of Bukowo and Stołczyn Zachodni became part of the neighbourhood of Glinki-Stołczyn, one of the administrative subdivisions of the Nad Odrą district. On 28 November 1990, the neighbourhood of Bukowo was founded as one of the administrative subdivisions of the West district, being governed by an elected neighbourhood council. The area of the former neighbourhoods of Nowe Bukowo and Stare Bukowo became part of the administrative subdivision of Warszewo.

Between 2001 and 2010, the St. Sister Faustina Kowalska Church was built at 72 Ogrodnicza Street in Bukowo, which belongs to the Roman Catholic denomination.

== Characteristics ==
Bukowo is a residential neighbourhood with low-rise single-family detached and semi-detached homes. The area includes the St. Sister Faustina Kowalska Church at 72 Ogrodnicza Street, which belongs to the Roman Catholic denomination.

The neighbourhood is placed on the Warszewo Hills. In its west, it includes a portion of the Ueckermünde Heath, which forms the Wodozbiór conservation area, with water sources of the Gręziniec stream, which forms the southern border of the neighbourhood. Further south, it crosses through a small lake named the Nightingale Pond. To the east from Wodozbiór conservation area, the neighbourhood also includes the Bukowo Pond. The urbanised area of the neighbourhood also includes several small ponds, including Deep Pond, Pond on the Hill, and Seagull Pond. In the southeast, Bukowo includes the Kupala Forest, an enclave of the Ueckermünde Heath. It is crossed though by several small creeks and screams, including Osiniec and Glinianka, and features Forest Hill and Green Hill, with their peaks at 77 m and 70 m, respectively. Additionally, the Gocław Tower, a Romanesque Revival observation tower dating to 1921, with the height of 25 m, stands on the Green Hill.

== Government and boundaries ==
Bukowo is one of the administrative neighbourhoods forming a subdivision of the North district in the city of Szczecin, Poland. It is governed by a locally elected neighbourhood council with 15 members. Its headquarters are located at 49 Pokoju Street. Its boundaries are approximately determined by Szosa Polska Street, Nehringa Street, Kupala Forest, the tracks of the railway line no. 406, Pokoju Street, Bogumińska Street, the Gręziniec stream, Kredowa Street, and the city boundary. Bukowow borders the neighbourhoods of Golęcino-Gocław, Stołczyn, and Warszewo, and the municipality of Police in Police County. The neighbourhood has the total area of 4.8 km^{2} (1.9 sq mi).
