= Sophie Auguste Tilebein Bench =

Monument in Szczecin, Poland

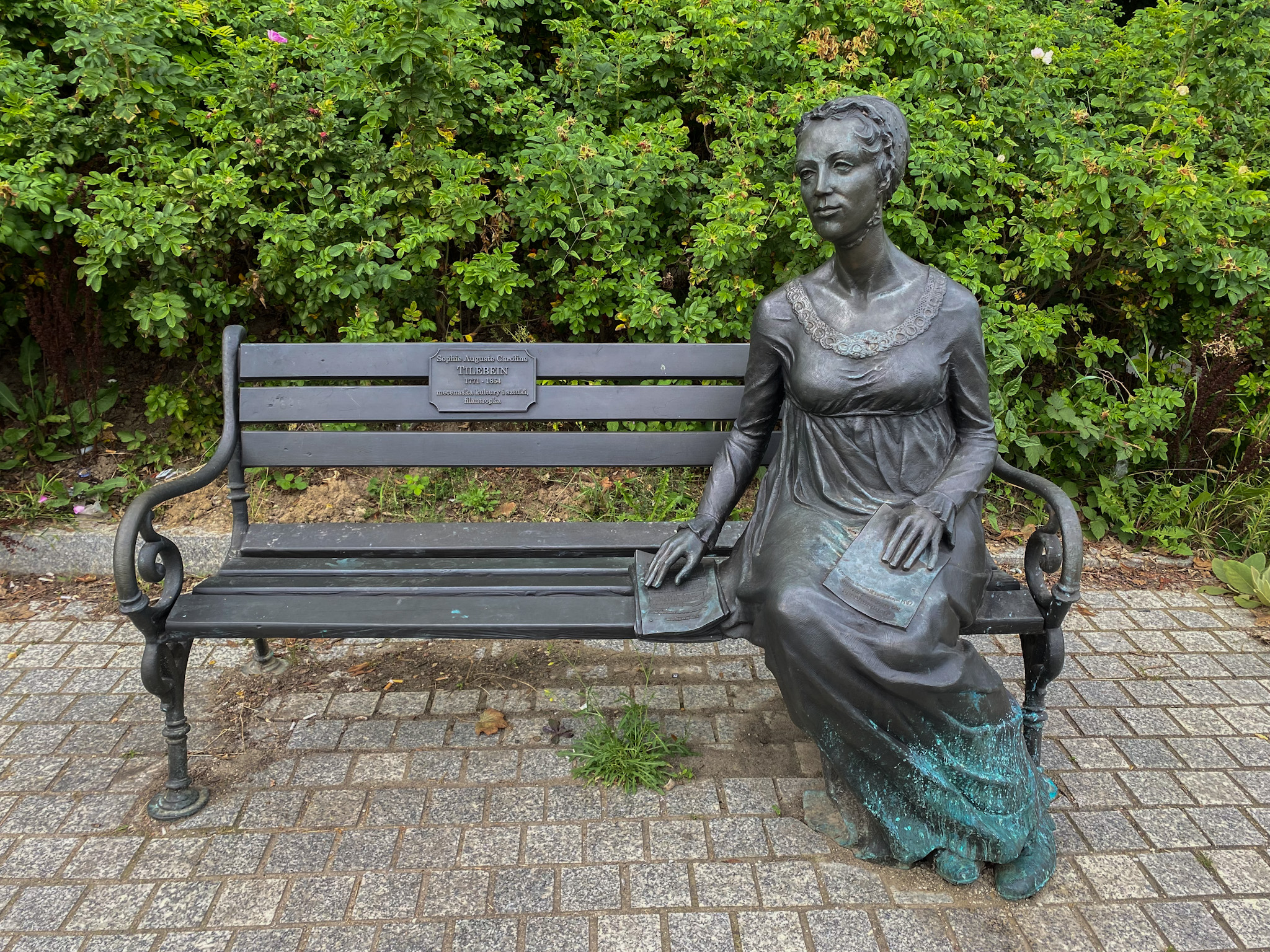
- The monument in 2025.
- Interactive map of Sophie Auguste Tilebein Bench
- Location: Robotnicza Street, Żelechowa, Szczecin, Poland
- Coordinates: 53°27′23.98″N 14°35′09.75″E
- Designer: Marian Molenda
- Type: Statue, bench monument
- Material: Bronze
- Opening date: December 2023
- Dedicated to: Sophie Auguste Tilebein

The Sophie Auguste Tilebein Bench (German pronunciation: [zoˈfiː aʊ̯ˈɡʊs.tə ˈti.leːbaɪ̯n]; Polish: Ławeczka Sophie Auguste Tilebein) is a monument in Szczecin, Poland, located within the neighbourhood of Żelechowa in North district. It is placed at corner of Robotnicza and Dębogórska Streets, in front of the Tilebein Park. The monument is dedicate to Sophie Auguste Tilebein (1771–1854), an 18th- and 19th-century painter, illustrator, philanthropist, and patron of culture and arts from Szczecin. It has a form of a life-sized bronze statue, depicted in a sitting position on a bench. It was designed by Marian Molenda, and unveiled in December 2023.

== History ==
The monument is dedicated to Sophie Auguste Tilebein (1771–1854), an 18th- and 19th-century painter, illustrator, philanthropist, and patron of culture and arts from Szczecin. Its construction was financed by the city of Szczecin as a participatory budgeting project. It was announced on 22 December 2021, and granted the building permission on 5 September 2023. The sculpture was designed by Marian Molenda, and unveiled in December 2023. It was placed in front of the Tilebein Park, which was named in commemoration of Sophie Auguste Tilebein. In the 19th century, the area of the park included the residence of the Tilebein family, destroyed in 1945.

== Characteristics ==
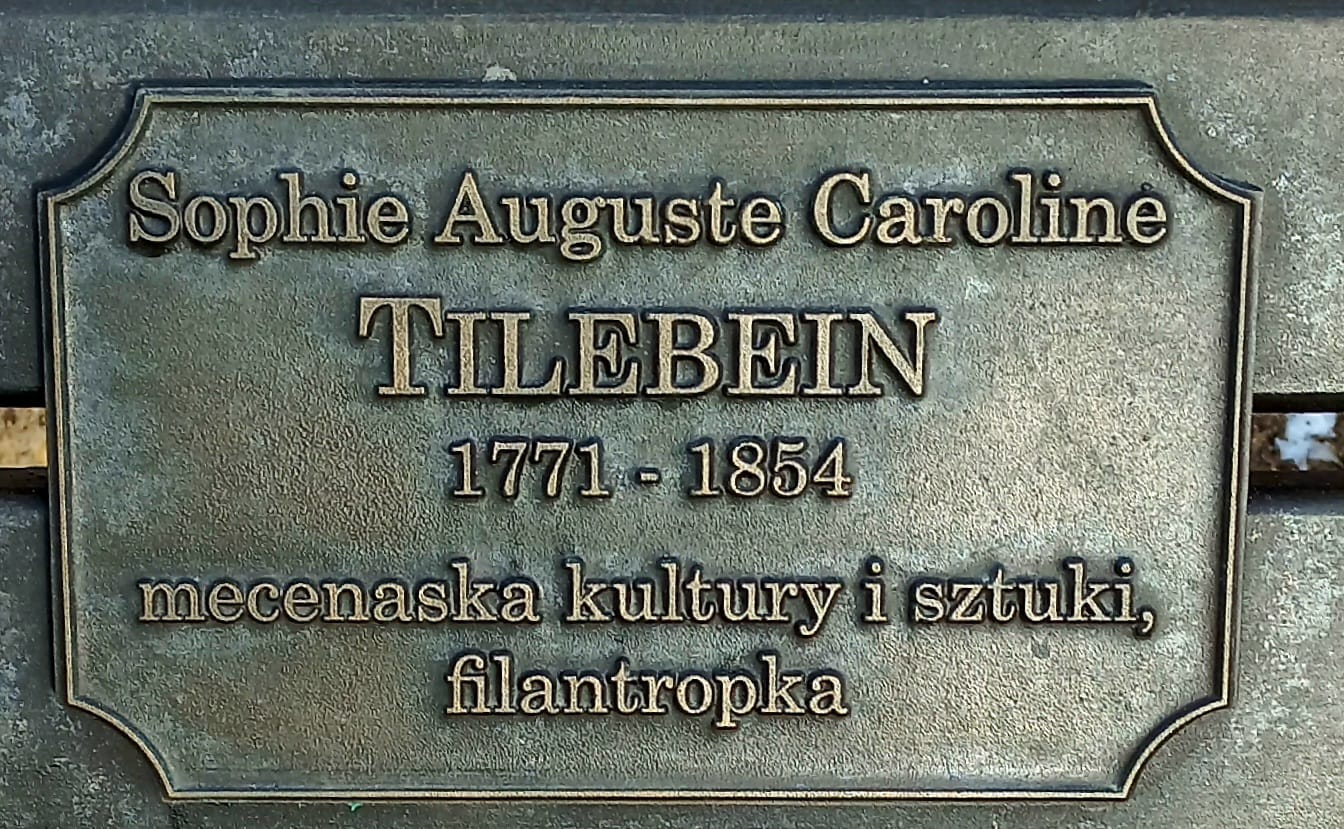
The commemorative plaque dedicated to Sophie Auguste Tilebein, installed on a bench next to the statue.

The sculpture is placed at the corner of Robotnicza and Dębogórska Streets, in front of the Tilebein Park. It consists of a life-sized bronze statue of Sophie Auguste Tilebein, installed on a left side of a bench. She is depicted in a sitting position, wearing a dress. Her left hand rests on a stack of papers placed on the bench seat next to her. It features the notal transcription of the song "Gruß an Züllchow" by Carl Loewe, dedicated to Tilebein. Her left hand rest on a piece of paper placed on her lap, which is the founding document of the Tilebein Foundation, which she founded to aid impoverish underaged girls. The backrest of the chair features a commemorative plaque with the Polish inscription which reads:

Polish inscription

Sophie Auguste Caroline Tilebein
1771–1854
Mecenaska kultury i sztuki,
filantropka

Translation:
English translation

Sophie Auguste Caroline Tilebein
1771–1854
A patron of culture and arts,
philanthropist
