= Odolany (disambiguation) =

Odolany may also refer to:

- Odolany, a neighbourhood in Warsaw, Masovian Voivodeship, Poland;
- Odolany, a neighbourhood in Szczecin, West Pomeranian Voivodeship, Poland.
