= Symbols of Warszewo =

Coat of arms of Warszewo
- Armiger: Warszewo
- Shield: Blue Iberian style escutcheon
- Compartment: White (silver) cross potent, and two white (silver) crescents with a white (silver) cross potent placed below it

Warszewo
- Adopted: 2011
- Design: White (silver) cross potent, and two white (silver) crescents with a white (silver) cross potent placed below it, on a blue background

The coat of arms and flag that serve as the symbols of Warszewo, a municipal neighbourhood of the city of Szczecin, Poland, depict two white (silver) cross potent, and two white (silver) crescents with a white (silver) cross potent placed above then, on a blue background.

== Design ==
The coat of arms and the flag of Warszewo depicts two white (silver) crescents, placed in a row, both facing with its insides outward, in the opposite directions to eatchother. Above them, is placed a white (silver) cross potent, that is two times smaller than the crescents. They are placed on the blue background. The coat of arms has an Iberian style escutcheon.

Two crescents symbolize the Order of Cistercians that used to own the village of Warszewo, while the cross, symbolises the Catholic Church, that influenced the lives of the population of the village in the past. The colours white and blue refer to the colours used in the symbols of the administrative subdivisions in the regions throughout history, mainly the flag of the Province of Pomerania, used from 1882 to 1935.

== History ==
Both coat of arms and flag of Warszewo were designed from the initiative of the local organization of Nasze Warszewo, with main contribution to the project coming from Radosław Porwich. In 2004, Porwich organized an art exhibition depicting history of the neighbourhood. While researching materials for the exhibition, he had requested the Landsmannschaft Pommern, to send him pictures of the coat of arms related to the neighbourhood. Following that, he had decided to develop a coat of arms of Warszewo, based on received materials. The design proposed by Nasze Warszewo organization had become an official symbol of the neighbourhood.

In 2011, Nasze Warszewo organization had designed the flag, based on the coat of arms. The flag had been officially adopted by the neighbourhood, and flown for the first time on 3 September 2011, during the celebration of 750th anniversary of the establishment of Warszewo.

== See also ==
- coat of arms of Szczecin
- flag of Szczecin
