= Warszewo Radio Broadcasting Station =

RSN Warszewo
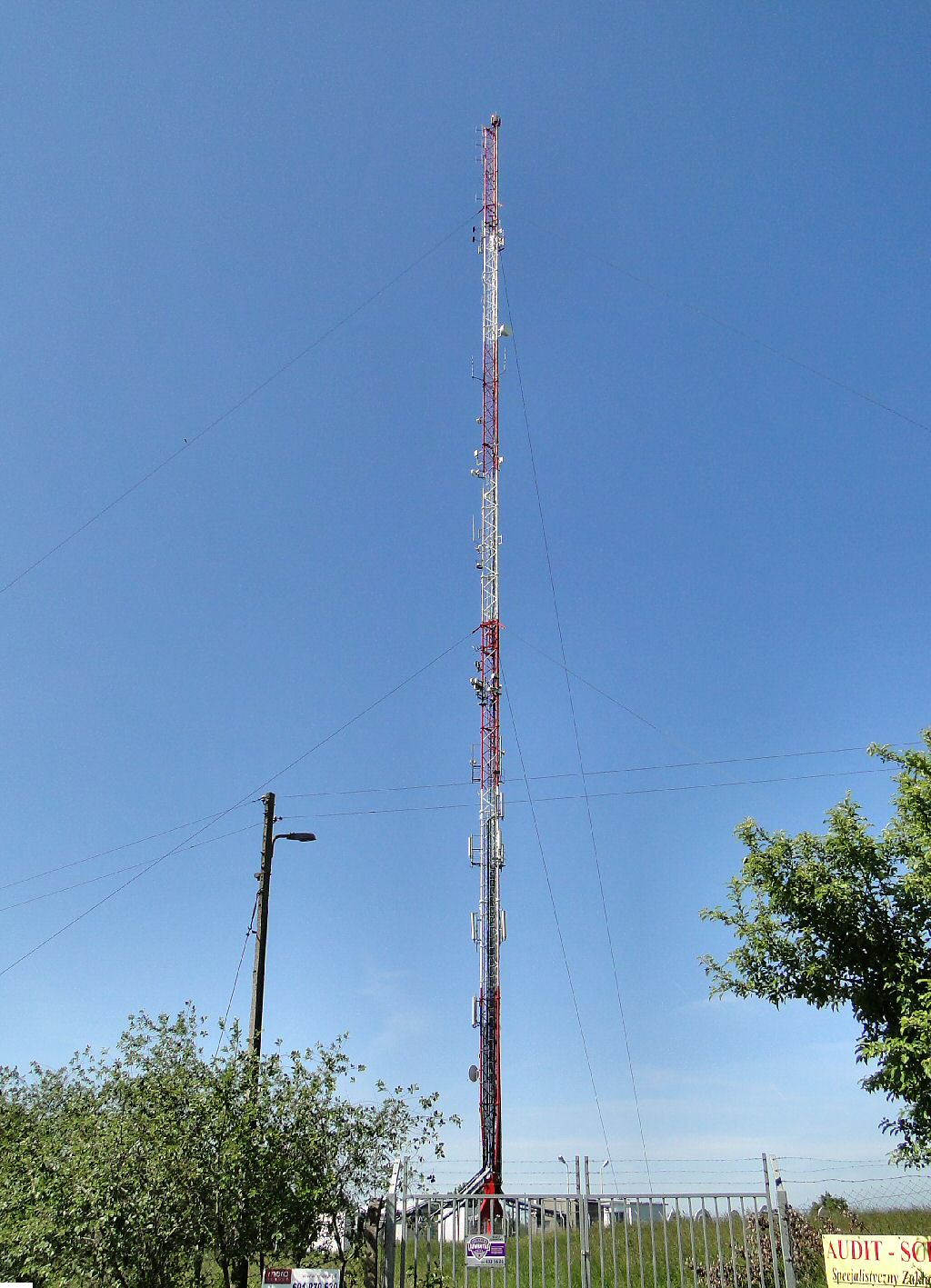
- Location: Warszewo, Szczecin, Poland
- Mast height: 113 m (371 ft)
- Coordinates: 53°28′31″N 14°32′38″E
- Built: 1949

Warszewo transmitter (Polish: RSN Warszewo) is a radio broadcasting facility at Warszewo, Szczecin, a suburb of Szczecin, Poland.

The Warszewo transmitter entered service in 1949 as medium wave broadcasting station, active in 1949–1950 on 1302 kilohertz (kHz), between 1950 and 1955 on 1259 kHz and between 1955 and 1978 on 1304 kHz. After the Geneva Frequency Plan went in service on November 22–23, 1978, it broadcast on 1260 kHz with a power of 160 kW and was therefore receivable at night time in all of Europe.

The Warszewo transmitter, which used as its antenna a 113 metres tall guyed mast radiator insulated against ground, stopped medium wave broadcasting on January 2, 1998. The mast was transformed afterwards into a mast for FM transmission, whereby its height increased to 114 metres. The basement insulator was bridged and its guys, divided by insulators, were replaced by guys without insulators.

== Transmitted programmes ==
Program	Frequency	Transmission Power
PR4 Polskie Radio S.A.	88,40 MHz	1 kW
Złote Przeboje Radio na Fali 89,8 FM Radio Na Fali sp. z o.o.	89,80 MHz	1 kW
Radio WAWA WAWA S.A.	95,70 MHz	1 kW
PR2 Polskie Radio S.A.	96,30 MHz	1 kW
Radio ESKA Szczecin "Radio Plama" Sp. z o.o.	96,90 MHz	1 kW
TOK FM - Pierwsze Radio Informacyjne INFORADIO Sp. z o.o.	99,30 MHz	0,10 kW
Radio Maryja Prowincja Warszawska Zgromadzenia O.O. Redemptorystów	101,60 MHz	1 kW

== See also ==
- List of tallest structures in Poland
