= Golęcino, Szczecin =

Neighbourhood of Szczecin, Poland

Golęcino
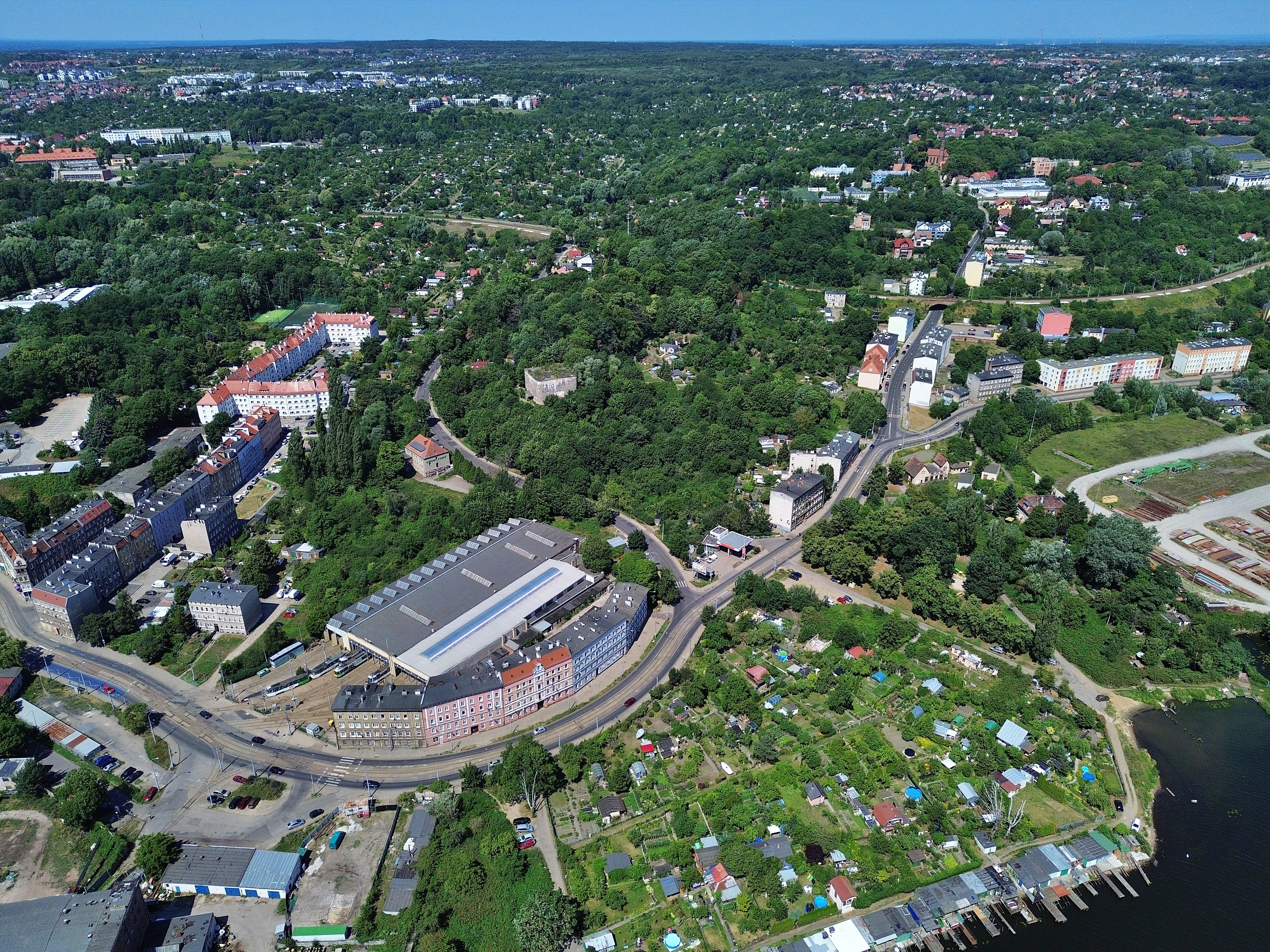
- Aerial view of Golęcino

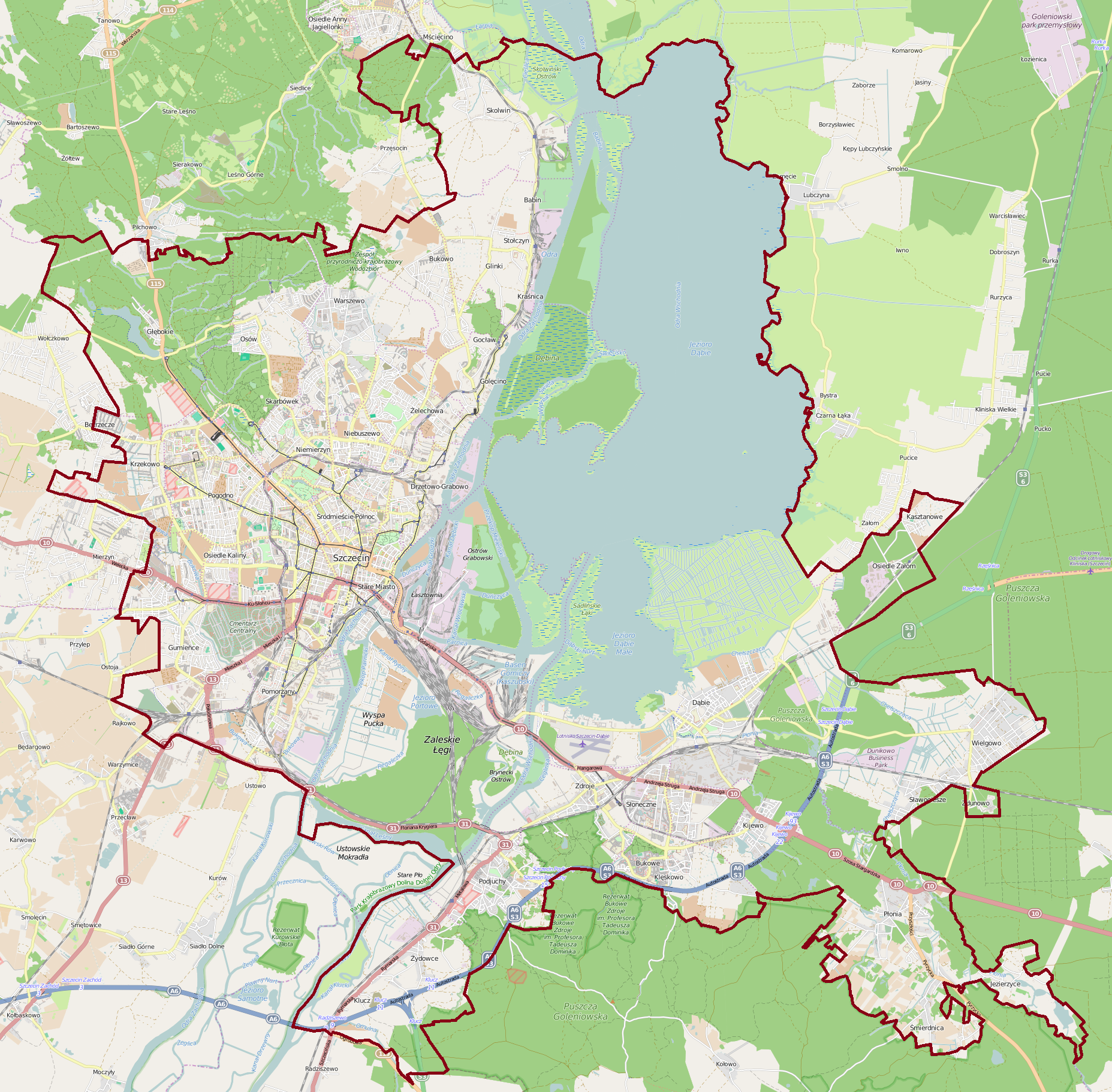
- Location within Szczecin Location within Poland
- Coordinates: 53°27′36″N 14°35′29″E
- Country: Poland
- Voivodeship: West Pomeranian
- County/City: Szczecin
- Neighbourhood: Golęcino-Gocław
- Time zone: UTC+1 (CET)
  - Summer (DST): UTC+2 (CEST)
- Vehicle registration: ZS

Golęcino (German: Frauendorf) is a part of the city of Szczecin, Poland situated on the left bank of the Oder river, in the northern part of the city. It belongs to the municipal neighbourhood of Golęcino-Gocław.

== Etymology ==
The name comes from the words "bare place", which refers to an area not covered with shrub.

== History ==
The area became part of the emerging Duchy of Poland under its first ruler Mieszko I around 967. Following Poland's fragmentation after the death of Bolesław III Wrymouth in 1138 it became part of an independent Duchy of Pomerania, which in 1227 became part of the Holy Roman Empire. During the Thirty Years' War, the settlement passed to the Swedish Empire, though it remained under the suzerainty of the Holy Roman Empire. Later, it came under the control of the Kingdom of Prussia. During World War II, Allied air raids on 13 May and 30 August 1944 caused damage to the settlement and its shipyard. After the defeat of Nazi Germany in World War II, Golęcino was integrated into Poland and incorporated into city of Szczecin.
