= Odolany, Szczecin =

Neighbourhood of Szczecin, Poland

Odolany
- Neighbourhood
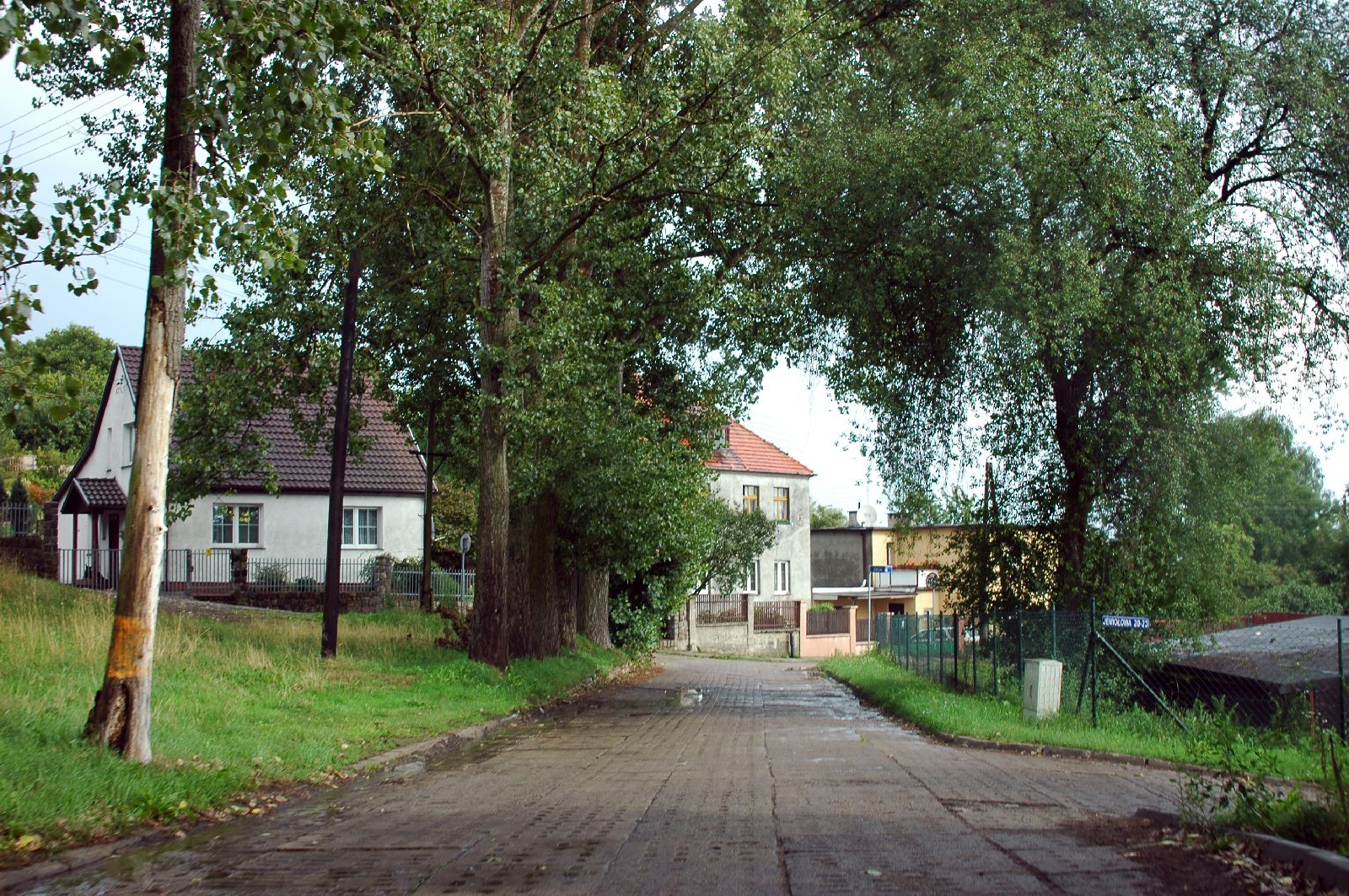
- Houses on Sarnia Street in Odolany.
- Country: Poland
- Voivodeship: West Pomeranian
- City county: Szczecin
- District: Północ
- Municipal neighbourhood: Warszewo
- Time zone: UTC+1 (CET)
  - Summer (DST): UTC+2 (CEST)
- Area code: +48 91
- Car plates: ZS

Odolany (Polish: [ɔdɔˈlanɘ̟]; German until 1946: Wedelshöhe [ˈveːdl̩sˌhøːə]) is a residential neighbourhood in the city of Szczecin, Poland, located in the municipal neighborhood of Warszewo, in the city district of Północ.

== Name ==
The current name of the neighbourhood, Odolany, was given to it after 1946, when, in the aftermath of World War II, it was incorporated from Germany into Poland. It was named after the neighbourhood of Odolany in the city of Warsaw. It comes from the Slavic male first name, Odolan. Prior to that, it was briefly known as Mściwoje (Polish: [mɕt͡ɕiˈvɔjɛ]). Originally, while under German administration, its name was Wedelshöhe, which in German means Wedel's Hill.

== History ==
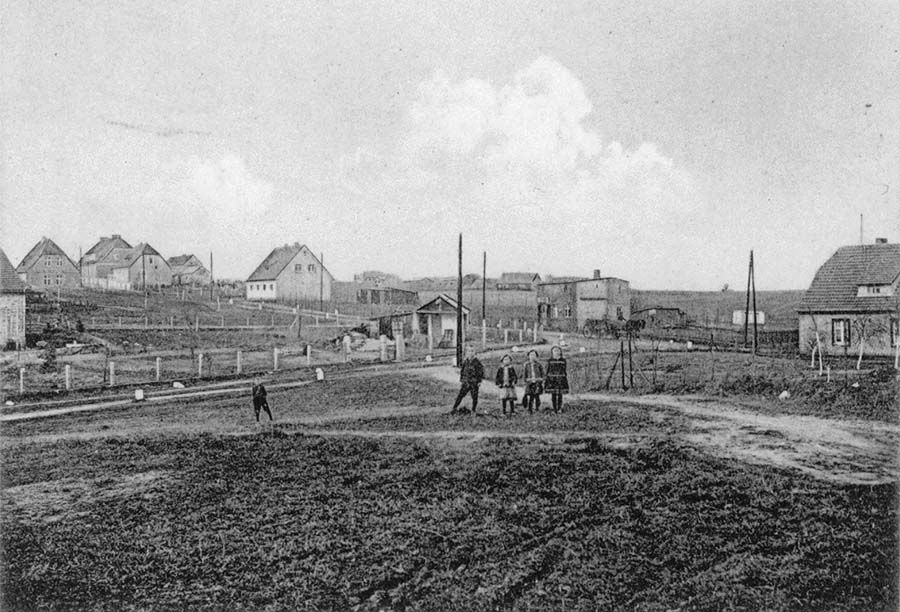
The crossing of current Kresowa Street, and Sarnia Street, in Odolany in 1928.

The suburban settlement of Wedelshöhe was built between the late 1920s, and early 1930s, to the south of the village of Warsow (now known as Warszewo). It was a small settlement of single-family detached homes and villas with gardens, inhabited by 180 people. The settlement was incorporated into the nearby city of Stettin (now known as Szczecin) on 15 October 1939.

During the Second World War there was located the Polenlager forced labour camp for Polish prisoners captured and deported from the General Government (occupied Poland) to Germany. The settlement was destroyed during the war.

In 1946, in the aftermath of World War II, it, as part of the area known as the Recovered Territories, was incorporated from Germany into Poland. It was then renamed from Wedelshöhe to Mściwoje. Later it was renamed again, to Odolany, after the neighbourhood of Odolany in the city of Warsaw.

In the 1960s, in Odolany begun being built new houses. In the 2000s, in the southern portion of the neighbourhood were built multifamily residential buildings.

In 1990, the city of Szczecin had been divided into districts and municipal neighborhoods. As such, Odolany was incorporated into the municipal neighborhood of Warszewo, in the city district of Północ.

== Location ==
Odolany is located within the southern portion of the municipal neighbourhood of Warszewo, Szczecin, which lies within the city district of Północ, in the city of Szczecin.
