= The Elephant (sculpture) =

1934 concrete sculpture in Szczecin, Poland

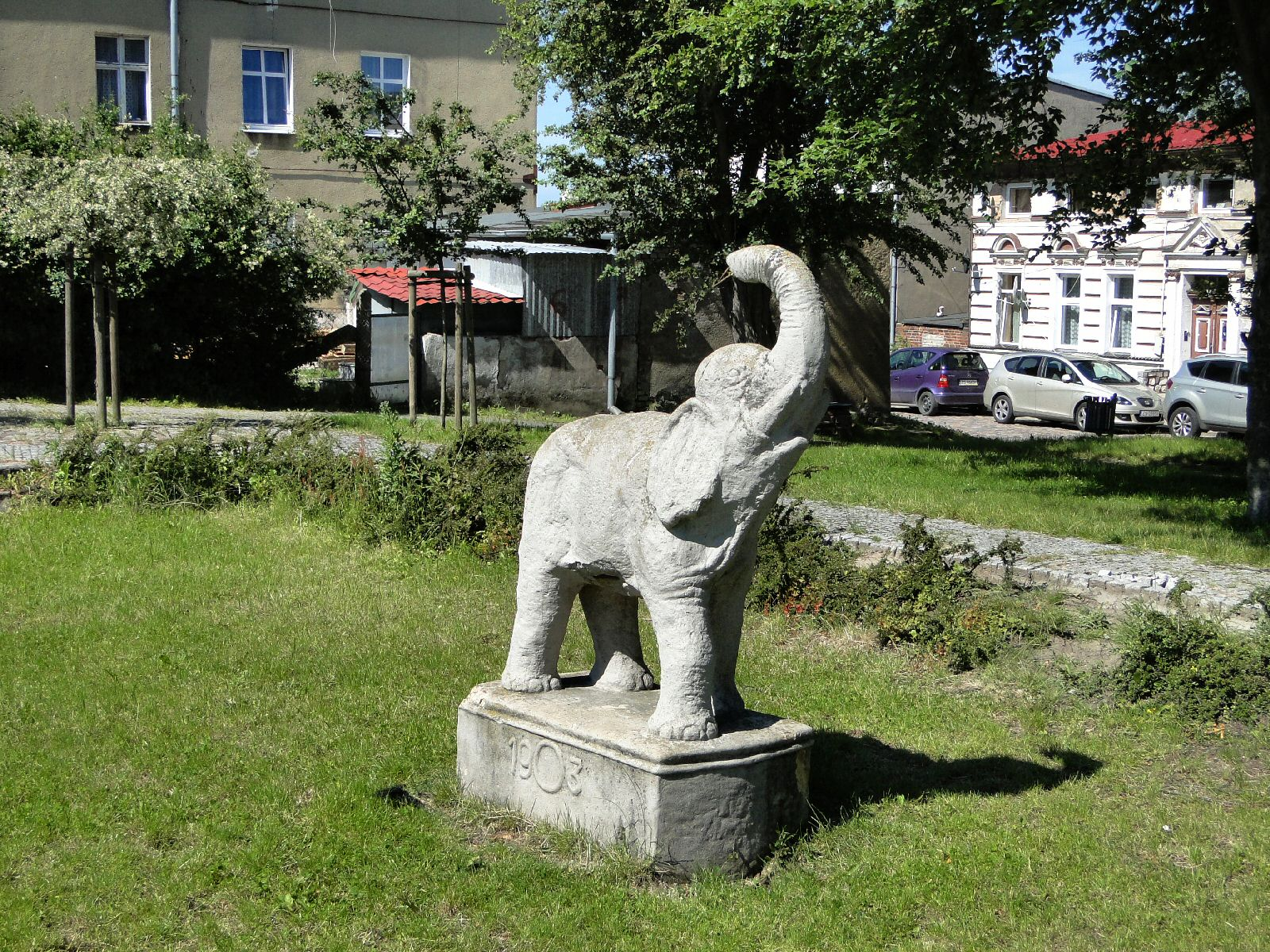
- The sculpture in 2009
- Artist: Kurt Schwerdtfeger
- Completion date: 1934
- Medium: Concrete
- Subject: Elephant
- Condition: Standing, renovated
- Location: Szczecin, Poland; 53.473245°N 14.546945°E

The Elephant (Polish: Słoń; German: Der Elefant) is a concrete sculpture in Szczecin, Poland, made in 1934 by Kurt Schwerdtfeger. It is located at the intersection of Poznańska and Szczecińska Streets, in the neighbourhood of Warszewo. The small statue depicts an elephant.

== History ==
The Elephant was sculptured in 1934 by Kurt Schwerdtfeger as the main element of a small fountain at the intersection of Poznańska and Szczecińska Streets. It stood in the centre of a small fountain bassin, and shot water out of its trunk. After the Second World War, the sculpture was renovated and remodeled numerous times. During one of them, its trunk have been shortened and changed from pointing straight up, to curling behind its head.

The fountain operated until the 1960s. Later, its basin was filled up with sand, and eventually deconstructed in 2004, being replaced with a grass lawn. The sculpture was renovated again in 2016.

While there have been calls to restore the fountain, it was decided against, as water could damage the ageing and deteriorating sculpture.

== Characteristics ==
The sculpture is made from concrete, and depicts an elephant, with its trunk elevated above its head, and curled to the back. It is placed in the centre of a small garden square at the intersection of Poznańska and Szczecińska Streets.
