= Gocław, Szczecin =

Neighbourhood of Szczecin, Poland

Gocław
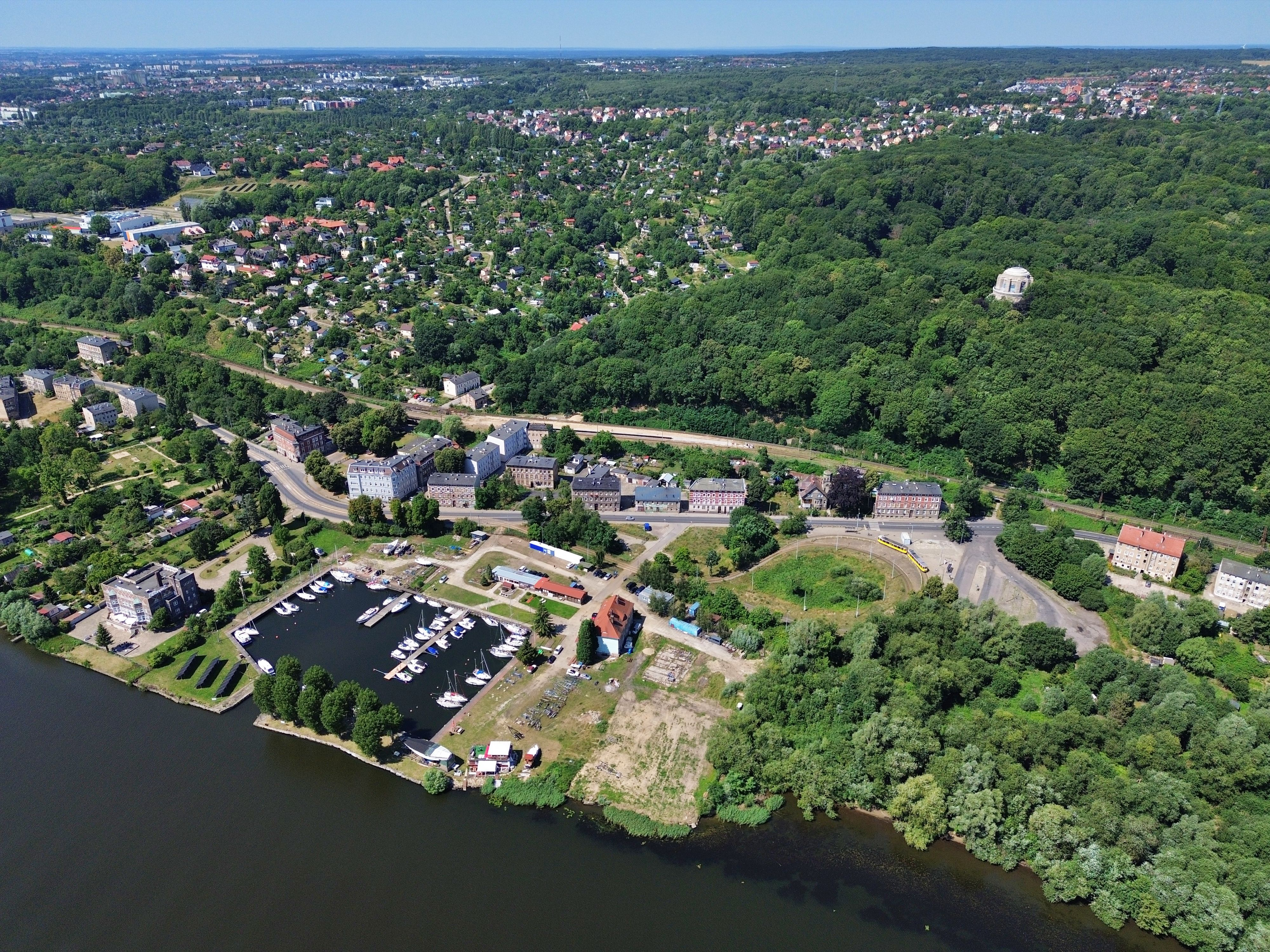
- Aerial view of Gocław

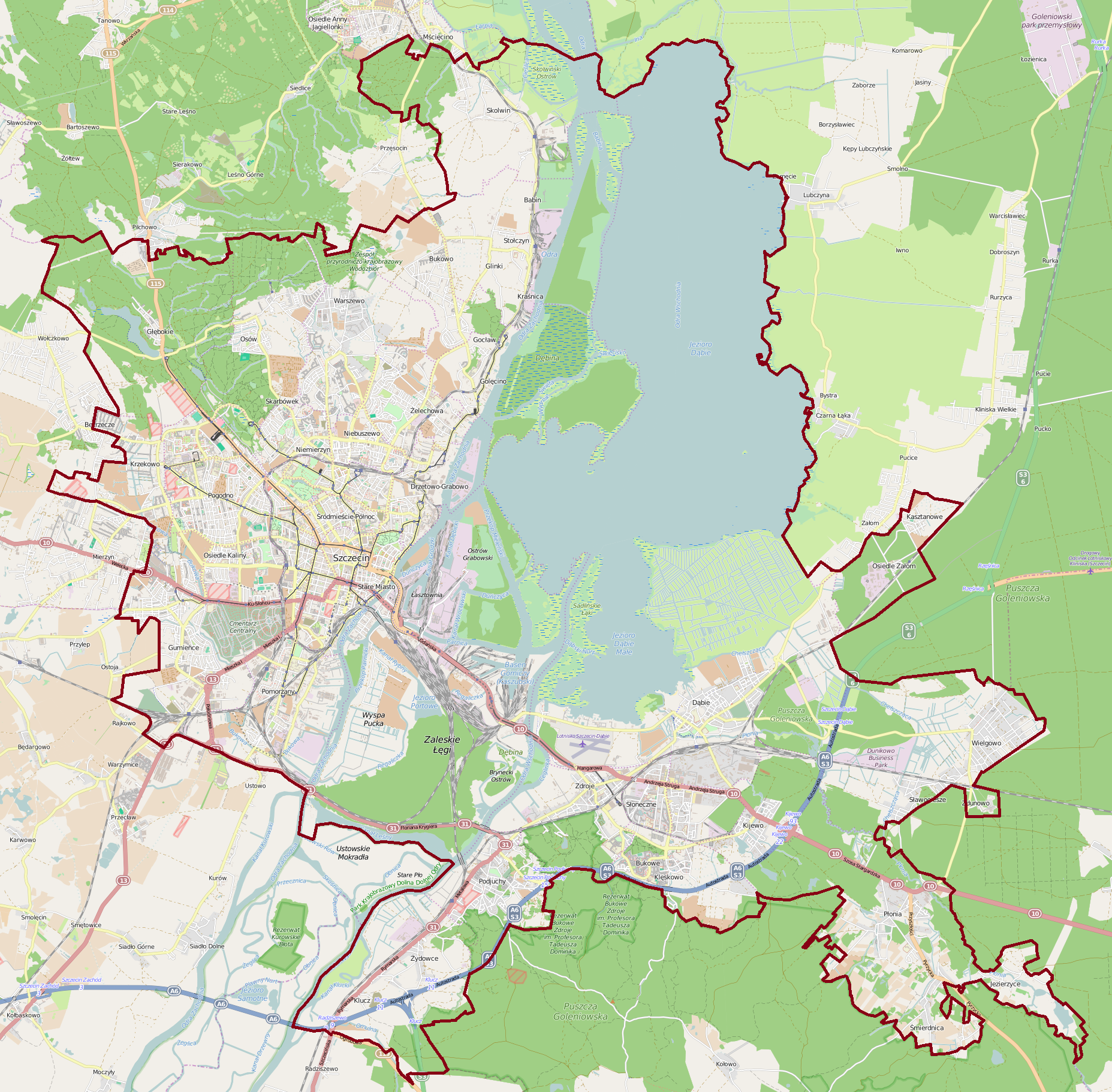
- Location within Szczecin Location within Poland
- Coordinates: 53.4756°N 14.6043°E
- Country: Poland
- Voivodeship: West Pomeranian
- County/City: Szczecin
- Neighbourhood: Golęcino-Gocław
- Time zone: UTC+1 (CET)
  - Summer (DST): UTC+2 (CEST)
- Vehicle registration: ZS
- Primary airport: Solidarity Szczecin–Goleniów Airport

Gocław is a part of the city of Szczecin, Poland. It is located on the left bank of the Oder river, in the northern part of the city.

== History ==
The area became part of the emerging Polish state under its first ruler Mieszko I around 967, and following Poland's fragmentation it formed part of the Duchy of Pomerania. The region became German-settled during Ostsiedlung and the village was termed Gotzlow.

During the Thirty Years' War, the settlement fell to the Swedish Empire, but stayed part of the Holy Roman Empire of the German Nation. Later on, it passed to Prussia. The place became well known since a huge Bismarck tower, now known as the Gocław Tower, had been built on top of a hill in the vicinity of the river Oder.
