= Gocław Tower =

- Wieża Gocławska
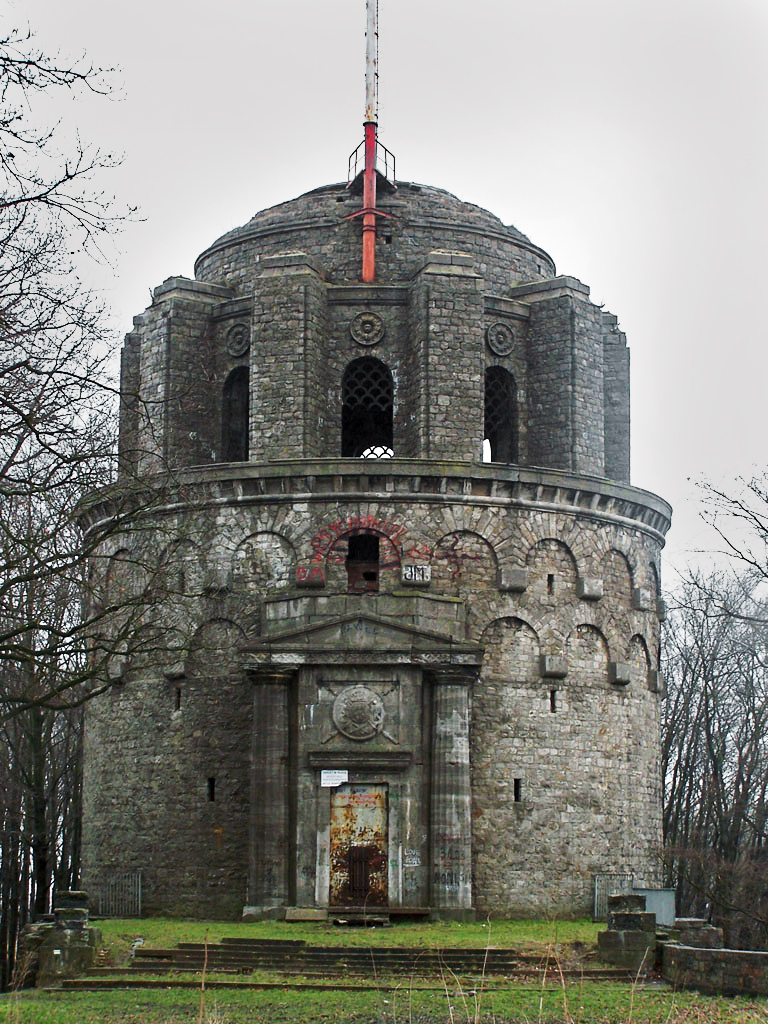

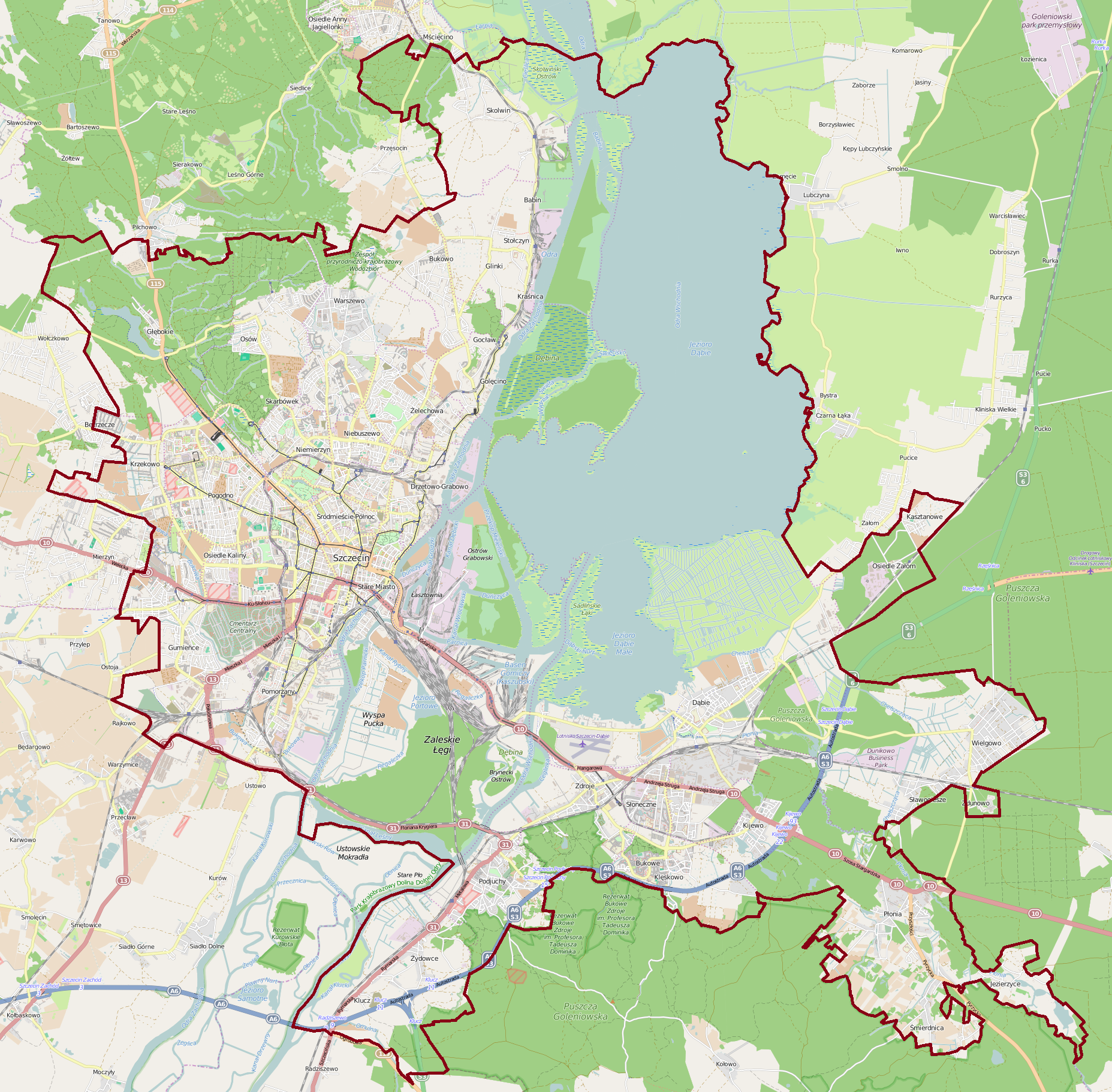
- Location within Szczecin Gocław Tower (Poland)

General information
- Location: Szczecin, Poland
- Coordinates: 53.4772°N 14.6016°E
- Construction started: 1913
- Completed: 1921

Gocław Tower (Polish: Wieża Gocławska) is a historical observation tower and cultural heritage site in Szczecin, Poland, located in the Gocław neighbourhood.

== History ==
It was built as a Bismarck tower under the German Empire. Its construction began relatively late, in 1913, and it was only finished in 1921. The total construction cost of the 25-metre (82 ft)-tall tower was approximately 200,000 German Papiermarks.

The tower is located on top of a small hill and is surrounded by a small wood, although the surrounding area is now generally industrial. It is approximately 6 kilometres (3.7 mi) from the city centre, close to a tram terminus.

Although one can visit the tower, the main entry way is fully sealed off, as are all windows, making entry impossible. It is also in need of restoration.
