= Sienno, Szczecin =

Neighbourhood of Szczecin, Poland

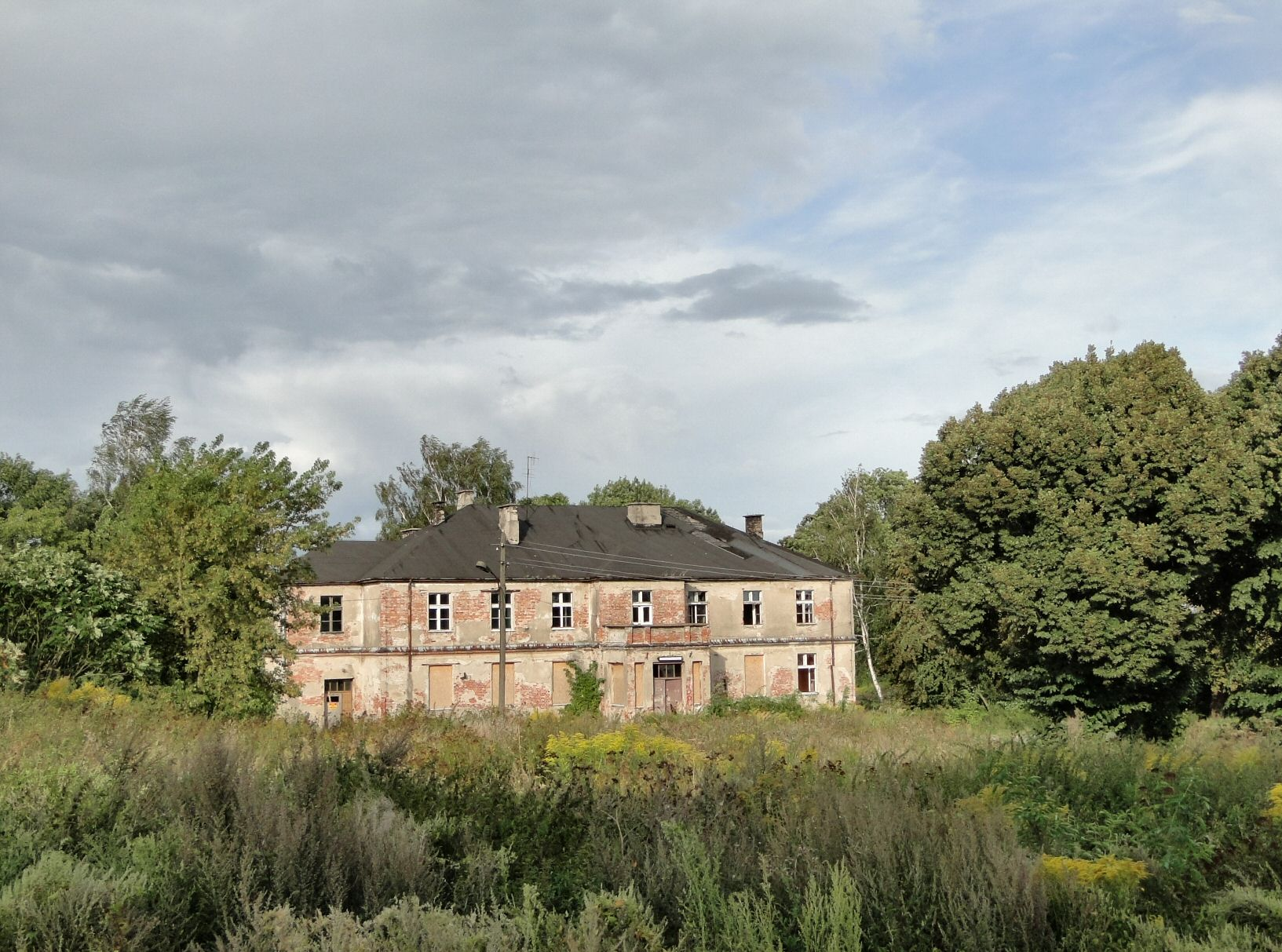
The manor house of Sienno)

Sienno is a part of the Szczecin City, Poland situated on the left bank of Oder river, north of the Szczecin Old Town and Middle Town.

There is an historic manor house which is in a semi-ruined condition.
