= Golęcino-Gocław =

- Municipal neighbourhood
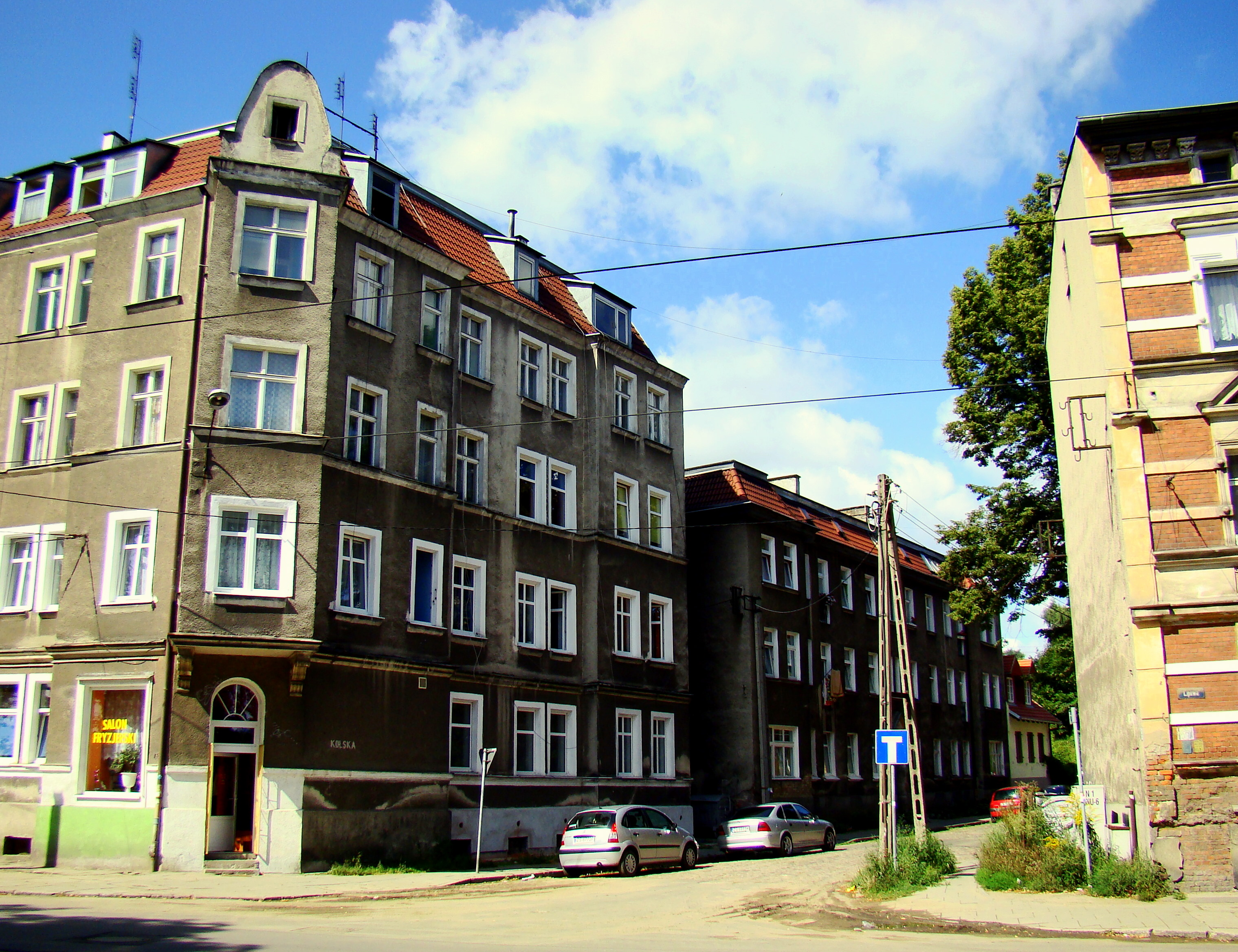
- Buildings in Gocław

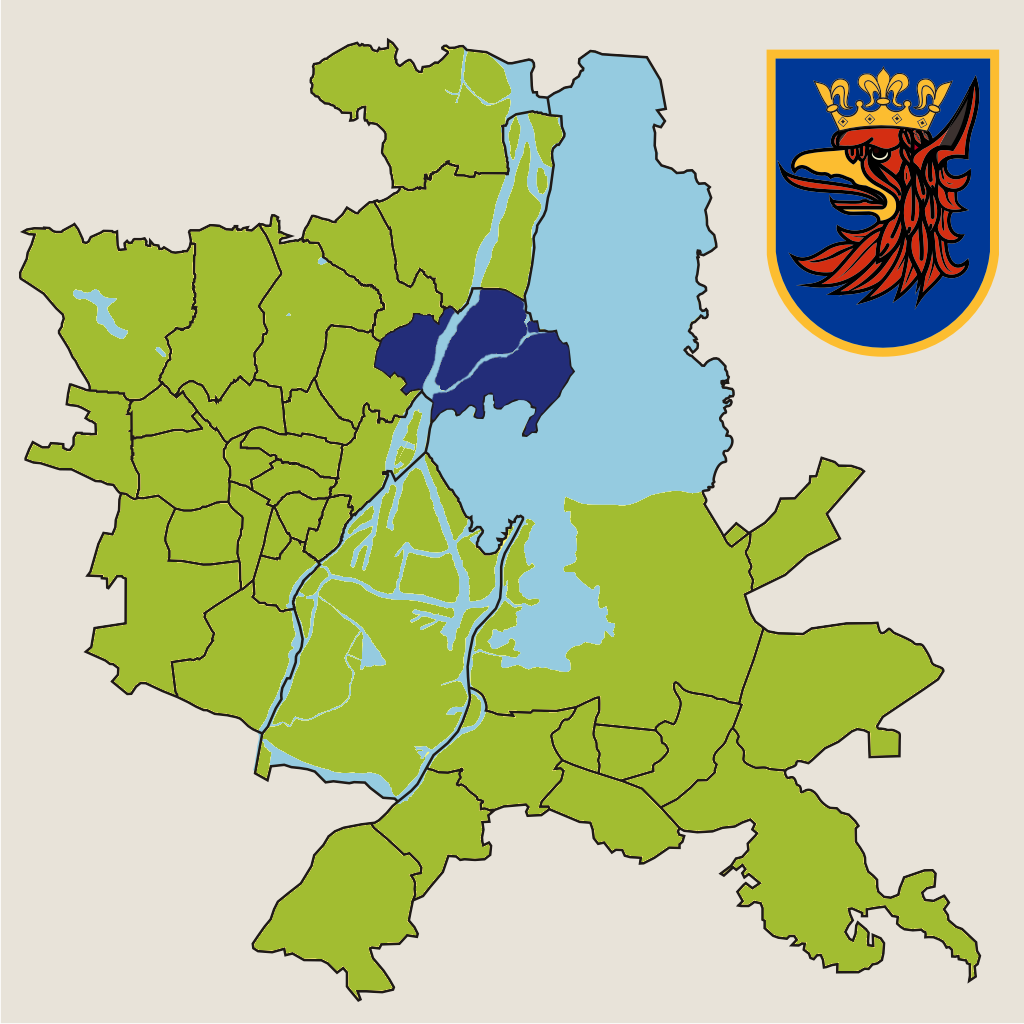
- Location of Golęcino-Gocław within Szczecin
- Coordinates: 53°28′32″N 14°36′16″E
- Country: Poland
- Voivodeship: West Pomeranian
- County/City: Szczecin

Population (2011)
  - Total: 3,417
- Time zone: UTC+1 (CET)
  - Summer (DST): UTC+2 (CEST)
- Area code: +48 91
- Car plates: ZS

Golęcino-Gocław is a municipal neighbourhood of the city of Szczecin, Poland situated on the Oder river, and Dąbie Lake, north of the Szczecin Old Town, and Middle Town. As of January 2011 it had a population of 3,417.

Golęcino-Gocław comprises Golęcino and Gocław.
