= Północ, Szczecin =

Coordinates: 53.4925°N 14.5923°E

Północ
- District
- Interactive map of Północ
- Country: Poland
- Voivodeship: West Pomeranian
- County/City: Szczecin

Population (2011)
  - Total: 54,004
- Time zone: UTC+1 (CET)
  - Summer (DST): UTC+2 (CEST)
- Area code: +48 91
- Car plates: ZS

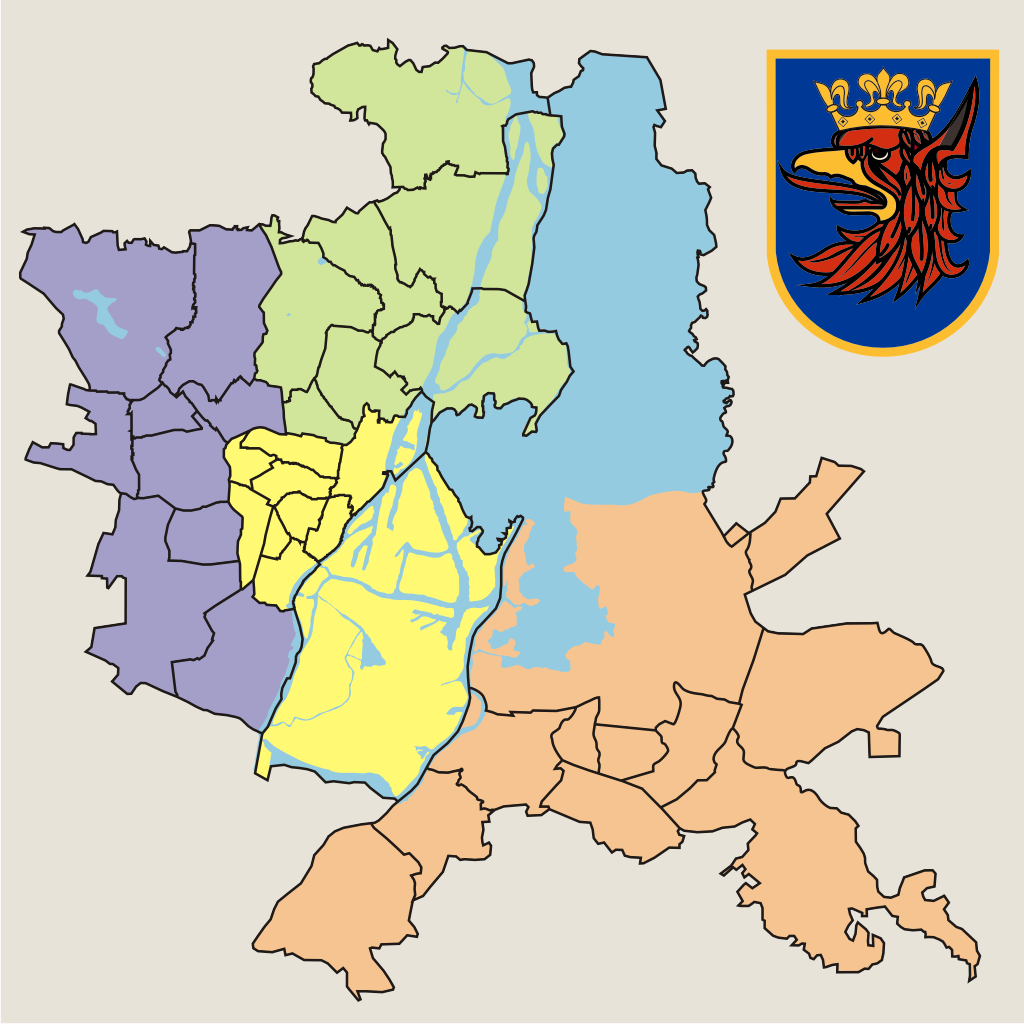
Districts of Szczecin: Śródmieście Zachód Północ Prawobrzeże

Północ (lit. North) is one of four districts (Polish: dzielnica) of Szczecin, Poland situated in northern part of the city. As of January 2011 it had a population of 54,004.

Północ is divided into 9 municipal neighbourhoods:

- Bukowo
- Golęcino-Gocław
- Niebuszewo
- Skolwin
- Stołczyn
- Warszewo
- Żelechowa
