= Żelechowa =

- Municipal neighbourhood
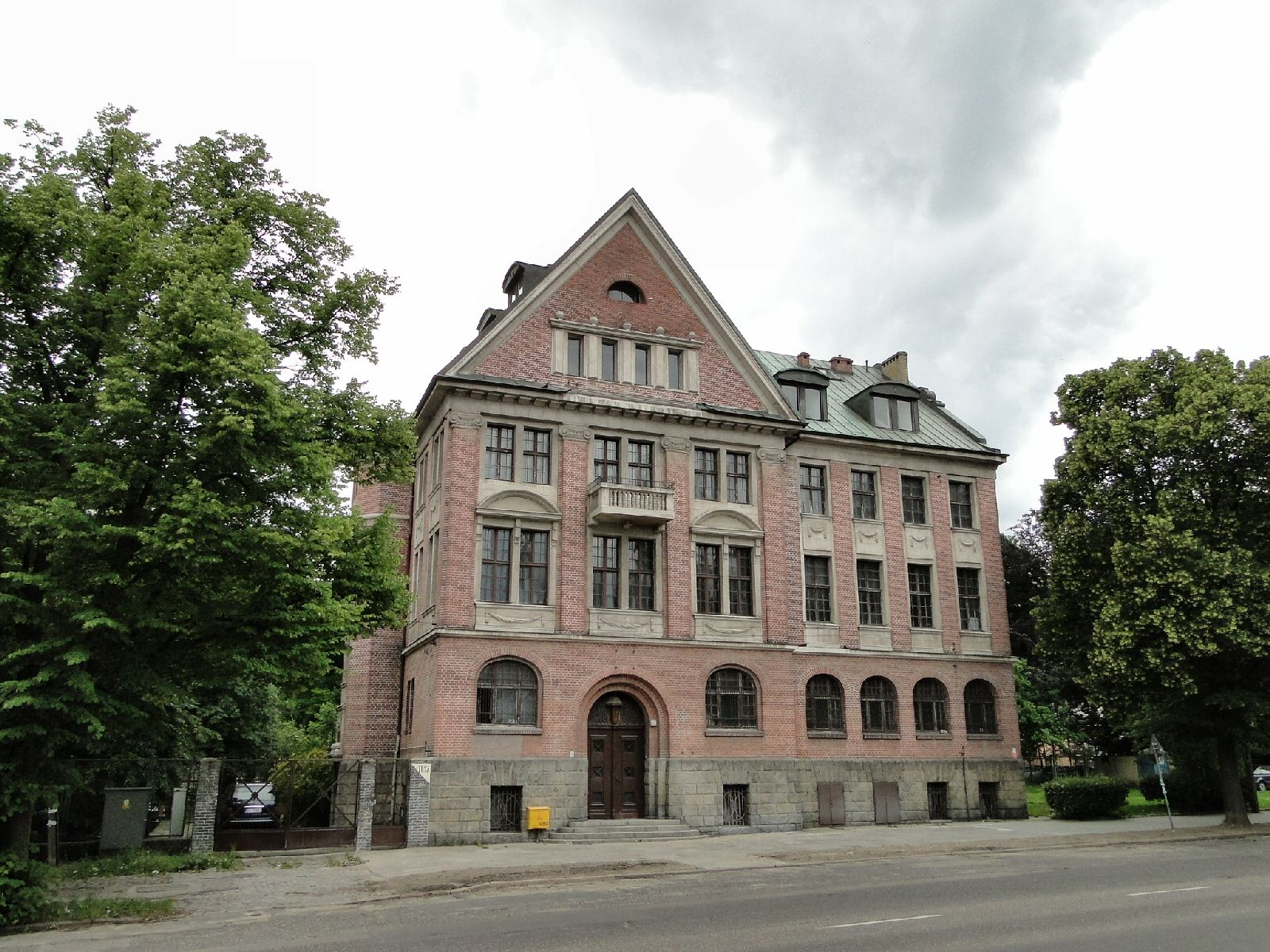
- Old town hall in Żelechowa

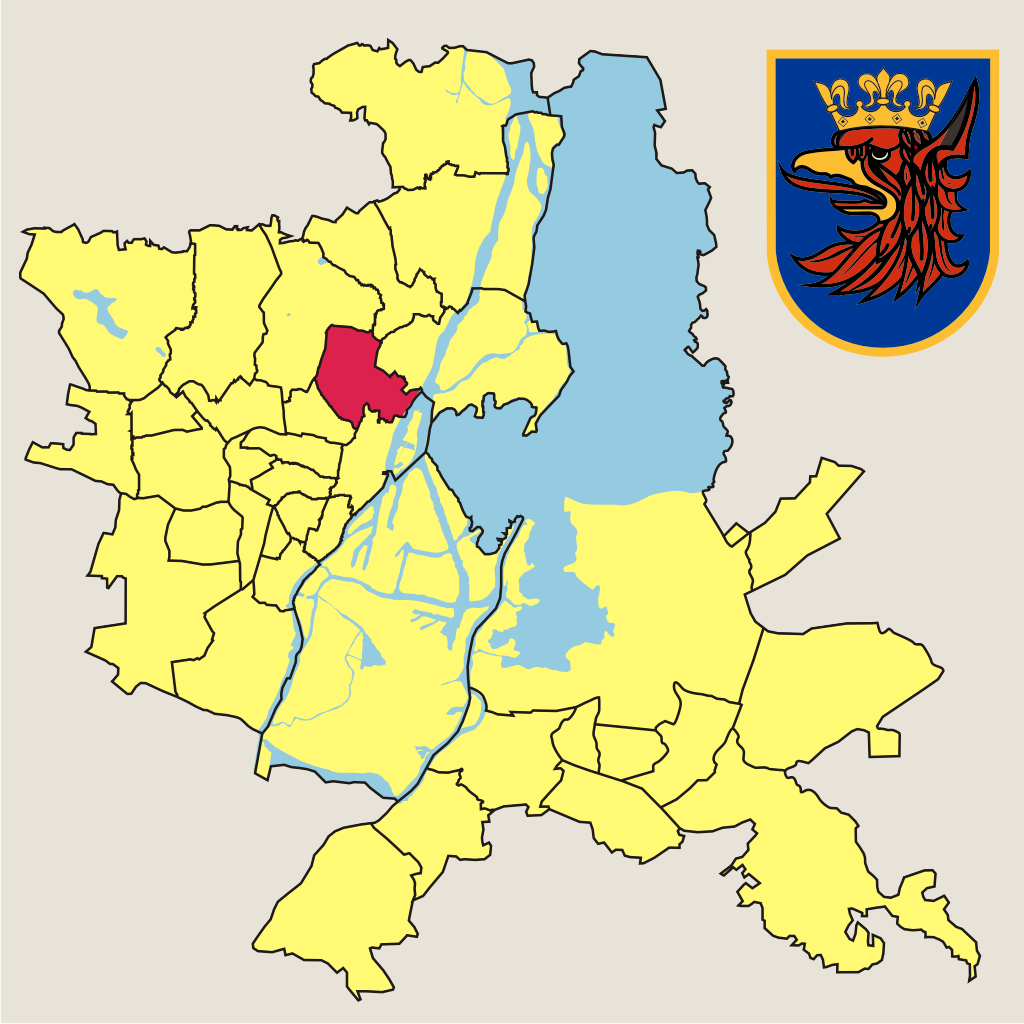
- Location of Żelechowa within Szczecin
- Coordinates: 53°27′28″N 14°34′57″E
- Country: Poland
- Voivodeship: West Pomeranian
- County/City: Szczecin

Population (2011)
  - Total: 13,971
- Time zone: UTC+1 (CET)
  - Summer (DST): UTC+2 (CEST)
- Area code: +48 91
- Car plates: ZS

Żelechowa is a municipal neighbourhood of the city of Szczecin, Poland situated on the left bank of Oder river, in the north-central part of the city. As of January 2011 it had a population of 13,971.

The area became part of the emerging Duchy of Poland under its first ruler Mieszko I around 967, and following Poland's fragmentation in 1138, it formed part of the Duchy of Pomerania. During the Thirty Years' War, the settlement fell to the Swedish Empire. Later on, it passed to Prussia, and from 1871 it was part of the German Empire, within which it was known as Zūllchow. In 1945, the area became part of Poland.
