= Drzetowo =

Neighbourhood of Szczecin, Poland

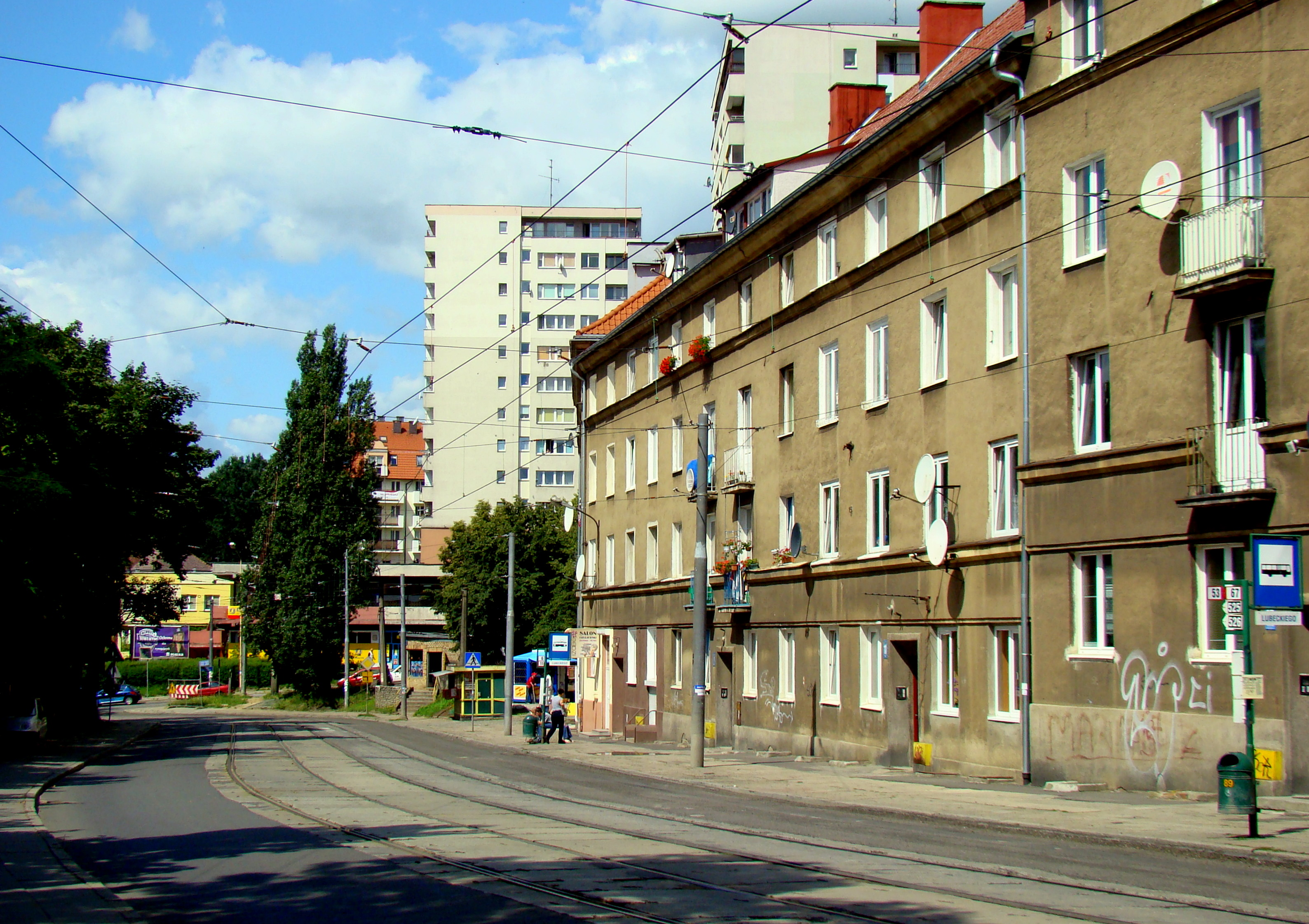

- Location within Poland
- Coordinates: 53.450671°N 14.571127°E
- Country: Poland
- Voivodeship: West Pomeranian
- County/City: Szczecin
- District: Drzetowo-Grabowo
- Time zone: UTC+1 (CET)
  - Summer (DST): UTC+2 (CEST)
- Vehicle registration: ZS

Drzetowo is a historical neighbourhood of the city of Szczecin, Poland. It was merged with another historical neighbourhood (Grabowo) to form the present Drzetowo-Grabowo neighbourhood.

== History ==
The area became part of the Polish state under its first ruler Mieszko I around 967, and following Poland's fragmentation it formed part of the Duchy of Pomerania.

The village was historically known as Stettin-Bredow or just Bredow. During the Thirty Years' War, the area fell under the Swedish Empire. Later, it passed to Prussia and, from 1871 until 1945, was part of Germany.

Historically, when part of Germany, the Vulcan iron-works and shipbuilding yards were located here. The liners “Deutschland” (1900), the “Kaiserin Augusta Victoria” (1906), and the “George Washington” (1908), then the largest vessel — 722 feet (220 m) long, 27,000 tons — in the German mercantile marine, were built. There were also sugar, cement and other factories. Under Nazi Germany, in 1933, a concentration camp was established in the district.

After World War II, in 1945, the area was reintegrated into Poland according to the Potsdam Agreement.
