= List of districts and neighbourhoods in Szczecin =

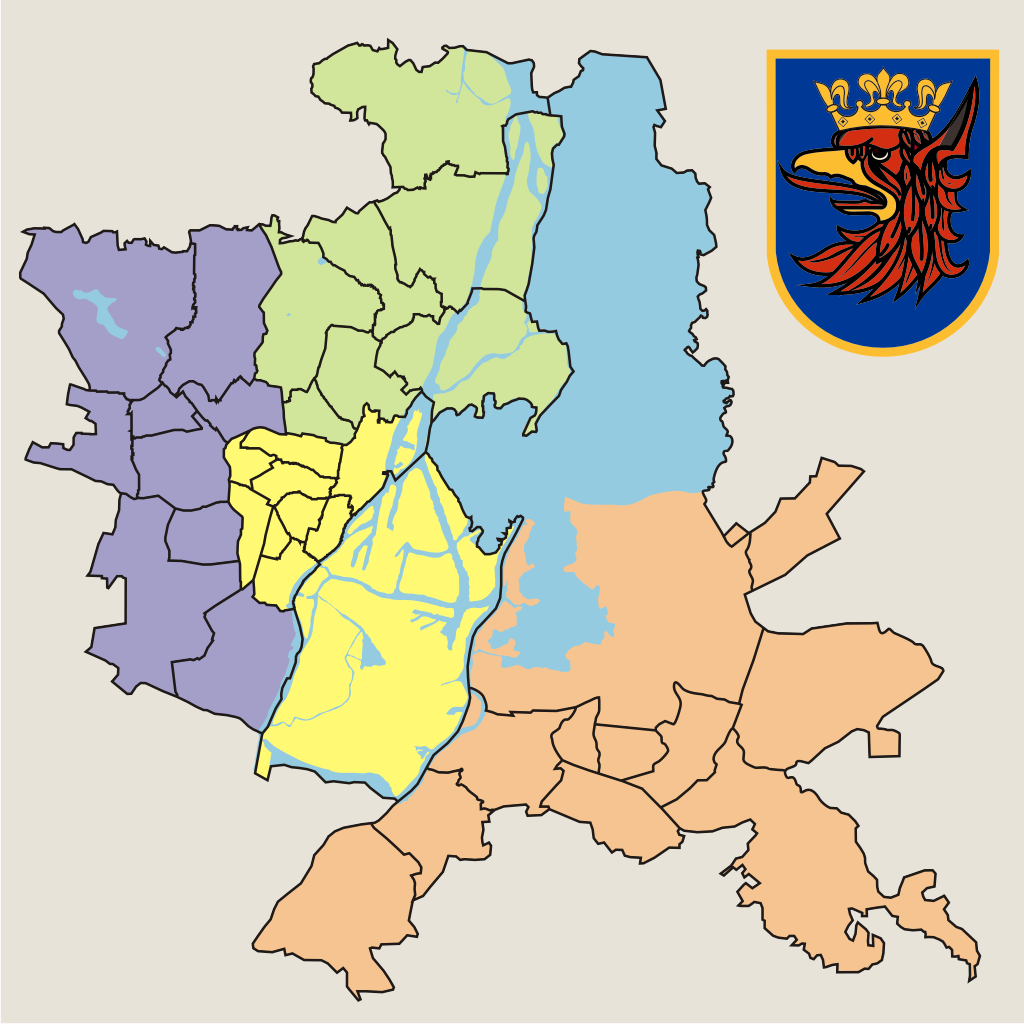
The map of Szczecin divided into districts and neighbourhoods. The districts are: Północ (lit. 'North') Prawobrzeże (lit. 'Right Bank') Śródmieście (lit. 'Downtown') Zachód (lit. 'West')

The city of Szczecin in the West Pomeranian Voivodeship, Poland is divided into four districts (Polish: dzielnica), which are Północ (lit. 'North'), Prawobrzeże (lit. 'Right Bank'), Śródmieście (lit. 'Downtown'), and Zachód (lit. 'West'). They are further divided into 37 administrative neighbourhoods (Polish: osiedle administracyjne). The districts have no independent administrative powers. Instead, they group the neighbourhoods and are used to aid the city government with administrative organisation, urban management, and planning. Neighborhoods have statuses of a municipal auxiliary unit (Polish: jednostka pomocnicza gminy), an administrative subdivision of the municipality of Szczecin (which simultaneously has a status of the city county). Each subdivision have a neighbourhood council (Polish: rada osiedla) as its legislative body, and a neighborhood board (Polish: zarząd osiedla) as its executive body. The council is locally elected from among the residents, with the term lasting four years, and has 15 members if the unit has under 20,000 residents, and 21 members if it surpasses it. The current subdivision system has been established on 28 November 1990.

== Government and elections ==
The city of Szczecin is subdivided into four districts (Polish: dzielnica), which are further divided into 37 administrative neighbourhoods (Polish: osiedle administracyjne). The districts have no independent administrative powers. Instead, they group the neighbourhoods and are used to aid the city government with administrative organisation, urban management, and planning. Neighborhoods have statuses of a municipal auxiliary unit (Polish: jednostka pomocnicza gminy), an administrative subdivision of the city county.

Each subdivision has a neighbourhood council (Polish: rada osiedla) as the legislative body, and a neighborhood board (Polish: zarząd osiedla) as the executive body. The council is locally elected from among the residents, with the term lasting four years, and has 15 members if the unit has under 20,000 residents, and 21 members if the population exceeds it. As of 2026, in total, there are 567 seats in the councils across the city. The council meetings have to be held at least twice a month, with the exception of the parliamentary recess. The board has between 5 and 7 members, and is internally chosen from among the councillors. It is led by a chairperson, and also includes a deputy chairperson and a treasurer.

The elections are ordered by the Szczecin City Council. To be eligible to vote in the election, a person needs to be registered as a resident of the neighbourhood and in the Central Electoral Registry (Polish: Centralny Rejestr Wyborców), be at least 18-years-old, and either hold the citizenship of Poland, or be a citizen of another European Union member state or the United Kingdom with a permanent residency status. To be eligible to become a candidate to the council, the individual needs to pass the criteria to vote in the local neighbourhood election, and receive 20 signatures supporting their candidacy from other valid electors. The members are chosen in a multi-winner plurality voting system, with each voter being entitled to vote for up to five candidates in the 15-member councils, and up to seven candidates in the 21-member councils. The seats are awarded directly to the candidates according to the number of votes they receive.

If fewer than 5% of eligible voters in a neighbourhood participate in the election, the election is declared invalid. Is such case, the council cannot be formed, with another election being possible to be organised on another date on the request of the residents, after the minimum of 12 months passing. If the number of valid registered candidates in a neighbourhood is less than 15 people, the time for registration is extended, and if the required number of candidates is still not reached, the election is cancelled. Such a case is subject to the same rules regarding holding enother election. If the number of valid candidates is equal to 15, all of them are automatically chosen to the council without the counting of the votes, provided that the neighbourhood passes the electoral threshold.

== List of districts ==
Name	Subdivisions	Population (2025)	Area (2025)		Density (2025)	
Name	Subdivisions	Population (2025)	km^{2}	sq mi	p/km2	p/sq mi
Północ (North)	7	69,887	56.84	21.95	1,230	3,184
Prawobrzeże (Right Bank)	11	74,583	148.89	57.49	501	1,297
Śródmieście (Downtown)	10	83,758	42.02	16.22	1,993	5,164
Zachód (West)	9	107,681	52.77	20.37	2,041	5,286

== List of neighbourhoods ==
Location	Name	District	Seat	Councillor seats	Population (2025)	Area (2025)		Density (2025)		Active council
Location	Name	District	Seat	Councillor seats	Population (2025)	km^{2}	sq mi	p/km2	p/sq mi	Active council
	Arkońskie-Niemierzyn	Zachód	1 Judyma Street	15	10,591	2.54	0.98	4,170	10,807	Yes
	Bukowe-Klęskowo	Prawobrzeże	50 Seledynowa Street	15	13,248	4.59	1.77	2,886	7,485	Yes
	Bukowo	Północ	49 Pokoju Street	15	4,678	4.81	1.86	974	2,515	Yes
	Centrum (Centre)	Śródmieście	42 Pope John Paul II Avenue	15	14,120	1.03	0.4	13,709	35,300	No
	Dąbie	Prawobrzeże	151 Gryfińska Street	15	11,918	80.52	31.09	148	383	Yes
	Drzetowo-Grabowo	Północ	9 Sławomira Street, suite 16	15	13,406	3.91	1.51	3,429	8,878	Yes
	Głębokie-Pilchowo	Zachód	49 Pogodna Street	15	1,075	12.59	4.86	85	221	Yes
	Golęcino-Gocław	Północ	93 Światowida Street	15	2,626	10.22	3.95	257	665	Yes
	Gumieńce	Zachód	76 Ku Słońcu Street	21	23,031	10.42	4.02	2,214	5,729	No
	Kijewo	Prawobrzeże	1 Pawia Street	15	3,252	3.97	1.53	819	2,126	Yes
	Krzekowo-Bezrzecze	Zachód	1A Klonowica Street	15	5,163	3.82	1.47	1,352	3,512	Yes
	Łękno	Śródmieście	12 Bogumiły Street, suite 9	15	2,800	1	0.39	2,800	7,179	Yes
	Majowe	Prawobrzeże	33 Nałkowskiej Street	15	6,494	1.9	0.73	3,418	4,682	Yes
	Międzyodrze-Wyspa Pucka	Śródmieście	27 Martyńska Street	15	699	31.85	12.3	22	57	Yes
	New Town	Śródmieście	46 Kaszubska Street	15	8,529	1.74	0.67	4,902	12,730	Yes
	Niebuszewo	Północ	40 Komuny Paryskiej Street, suite U8	15	15,250	1.63	0.63	9,356	24,206	No
	Niebuszewo-Bolinko	Śródmieście	39 Niemcewicza Street, suite 2	15	18,016	1.79	0.69	10,065	26,110	Yes
	Osów	Zachód	36A Miodowa Street	15	5,105	8.14	3.14	627	1,626	Yes
	Old Town	Śródmieście	4 Mariacka Street	15	3,603	1.1	0.42	3,275	7,798	Yes
	Płonia-Śmierdnica-Jezierzyce	Prawobrzeże	28 Pyrzycka Street	15	4,171	17.24	6.67	242	625	Yes
	Podjuchy	Prawobrzeże	31 Metalowa Street	15	7,531	5.13	1.98	1,468	3,804	Yes
	Pogodno	Zachód	6 Krasickiego Street	21	21,530	4.19	1.62	5,138	13,290	Yes
	Pomorzany	Zachód	1 Włościańska Street	15	17,049	7.05	2.72	2,418	6,268	No
	Skolwin	Północ	171 Stołczyńska Street	15	2,688	12.61	4.87	213	552	Yes
	Słoneczne	Prawobrzeże	49 Rydla Street	15	11,234	1.43	0.55	7,856	20,425	Yes
	Śródmieście-Północ (Downtown-North)	Śródmieście	42 Pope John Paul II Avenue	15	9,746	1.41	0.54	6912	18,048	No
	Śródmieście-Zachód (Downtown-West)	Śródmieście	22 Władysława Łokietka Street	15	11,068	0.53	0.20	20,883	104,415	No
	Stołczyn	Północ	28 Kościelna Street	15	4,741	12.54	4.84	378	979.54	Yes
	Świerczewo	Zachód	11 Jodłowa Street	15	13,986	2.44	0.94	5,732	14,879	Yes
	Turzyn	Śródmieście	17 Pocztowa Street	15	15,177	1.57	0.61	9,667	24,880	No
	Warszewo	Północ	7 Poznańska Street	15	12,416	7.3	2.8	1,661	4,434	Yes
	Wielgowo-Sławociesze-Zdunowo	Prawobrzeże	35A Bałtycka Street, suite 1	15	3,972	13	5.02	306	791	Yes
	Załom-Kasztanowe	Prawobrzeże	54 Kasztanowe Street	15	3,162	4.39	1.69	720	1871	Yes
	Zawadzkiego-Klonowica	Zachód	246 Polish Armed Forces Avenue	15	10,151	1.58	0.61	6,425	16,640	Yes
	Zdroje	Prawobrzeże	1 Torfowa Street	15	7,521	6.42	2.48	1,171	3,033	No
	Żelechowa	Północ	3 Ostrowska Street, suite 1	15	14,082	3.82	1.47	3,686	9,580	No
	Żydowce-Klucz	Prawobrzeże	46 Rymarska Street, suite 1A	15	2,080	10.3	3.98	202	522	Yes

== Historic subdivisions ==
=== Until the 19th century ===
From the Middle Ages until the 19th century, the city of Szczecin (then roughly limited to the area of the modern neighbourhood of Old Town), was subdivided into four quarters. They were:

- Holy Spirit Quarter (German: Heiliger-Geist-Quartier; Polish: Kwartał Św. Ducha);
- Kessin Quarter (German: Kessiner-Quartier; Polish: Kwartał Chyżyński);
- Mill Quarter (German: Mühle-Quartier; Polish: Kwartał Młyński);
- Passau Quarter (German: Passauer-Quartier; Polish: Kwartał Passawski).

=== Subdivision between 1955 and 1976 ===
The division of Szczecin into four districts between 1955 and 1976.

From 1955 to 1976, the city was subdivided into four districts, which were: Dąbie, Nad Odrą, Pogodno, and Śródmieście (lit. 'Downtown'). They were further subdivided into 31 neighbourhoods in total. Each district was governed by District National Councils (Polish: Dzielnicowa Rada Narodowa). The district of Śródmieście had 60 councillors, while the rest had 50 councillors each. They operated within national council system of Poland, and had three-year terms. They were subordinate to the Municipal National Council of Szczecin. being subordinate to the Municipal National Council of Szczecin. The councils acted as legislative organs of the local government, with a presidiums being elected internally from among the councillors, as executive organs, themselves led by a chairpersons. Although the national councils were formally elected, the elections were conducted within a communist political system in which the Polish United Workers' Party controlled the political process, end exerted great control over the candidates and the results. On 1 April 1961, the boundaries of the districts were modified, with the neighbourhood of Pomorzany being transferred from Pogodno to Śródmieście. Additionally, Pogodno also annexed territories on its northwestern border from Śródmieście.

==== Districts (1955–1976) ====
Location (1965)	Name	Subdivisions		Councillor seats (1961)	Population (1961)	Area (1955)		Area (1961)		Density (1961)	
Location (1965)	Name	1955–1961	1961–1975	Councillor seats (1961)	Population (1961)	km^{2}	sq mi	km^{2}	sq mi	p/km2	p/sq mi
	Dąbie	9	9	50	28,146	130	50.19	128	49.42	220	570
	Nad Odrą (On the Oder)	8	8	50	33,922	54	20.85	56	21.62	607	1,572
	Pogodno	9	8	50	65,821	54	20.85	51	19.69	1,291	3,343
	Śródmieście (Downtown)	5	6	60	143,039	42	16.22	51	19.69	2,805	7,265

==== Neighbourhoods (1955–1976) ====
Name	District		Population (1960)
Name	1955–1961	1961–1975	Population (1960)
Bezrzecze	Pogodno		719
Śródmieście (Downtown)	Śródmieście		103,175
Dąbie	Dąbie		28,146
Drzetowo	Nad Odrą		2,562
Głębokie	Pogodno		1,456
Glinki-Stołczyn	Nad Odrą		6,595
Gocław	Nad Odrą		800
Golęcin	Nad Odrą		5,851
Grabowo	Śródmieście		11,038
Gumieńce	Pogodno		9,155
Kijewo	Dąbie		640
Klęskowo	Dąbie		2,135
Klucz	Dąbie		1,278
Krzekowo	Pogodno		1,231
Łasztownia-Port	Śródmieście		2,668
Niebuszewo I	Śródmieście		18,586
Niebuszewo II	Nad Odrą		5,355
Niemierzyn	Pogodno		5,644
Ossowo	Pogodno		968
Podjuchy	Dąbie		6,099
Pogodno	Pogodno		30,030
Pomorzany	Pogodno	Śródmieście	6,225
Skolwin	Nad Odrą		3,924
Sławociesze	Dąbie		675
Świerczewo	Pogodno		3,714
Warszewo	Nad Odrą		2,214
Wielgowo-Zdunowo	Dąbie		2,334
Wyspa Pucka-Kępa Parnicka	Śródmieście		1,317
Zdroje	Dąbie		4,125
Żelechowo	Nad Odrą		5,085
Żydowce	Dąbie		2,603

=== Changes to the current system ===
The current subdivision system was established on 28 November 1990, with the city being subdivided into 4 districts and 36 administrative neighbourhoods. In 1994, the border of the districts of Śródmieście, Zachód was modified, with the changes to the neighbourhoods of Gumieńce, New Town, Pomorzany, and Turzyn. The boundaries of other neighbourhoods in Śródmieście, Północ, and Prawobrzeże were also modified. The neighbourhood of Wyspa Pucka was renamed to Międzyodrze-Wyspa Pucka. In 1998, the border of Śródmieście with Północ Zachód was modified. In 2003, the neighbourhood of Majowe-Kijewo was abolished, with neighbourhoods of Kijewo and Osiedle Majowe being established in its place. In 2005, the boundary between the neighbourhoods of Dąbie and Osiedle Majowe was modified. In 2012, the neighbourhood of Wielgowo-Sławociesze was renamed to Wielgowo-Sławociesze-Zdunowo, and Załom was renmaed to Załom-Kasztanowe.

From 1990 to 1995, the council membership was determined as:

- 15 councillors in the neighbourhoods up to 4,000 residents;
- 18 councillors in the neighbourhoods up to 7,000 residents;
- 20 councillors in the neighbourhoods up to 10,000 residents;
- 24 councillors in the neighbourhoods up to 20,000 residents;
- 28 councillors in the neighbourhoods up to 40,000 residents.

From 1995 to 2001, the council membership was determined as:

- 15 councillors in the neighbourhoods up to 4,000 residents;
- 18 councillors in the neighbourhoods up to 7,000 residents;
- 20 councillors in the neighbourhoods up to 10,000 residents;
- 22 councillors in the neighbourhoods up to 15,000 residents;
- 24 councillors in the neighbourhoods up to 20,000 residents;
- 28 councillors in the neighbourhoods up to 40,000 residents.

In 1995, the new neighbourhood statute gave the administrative neighbourhoods statuses of the municipal axuilary units, and changed the size of the neighbourhood board membership ranging from between 4 to 7 people to from 5 to 7 people. Since 2001, the neighbourhoods up to 20,000 residents have 15 councillors, and those exceeding it, 21 councillors.

In 2025, the neighbourhood statutes was modified, changing the term length for councillors from 5 to 4 years. Additionally, the election rules were changed introducing the minimum voter-participation threshold of 5% of registered electors in a neighbourhood, as well as the requirement for the number of candidates to be equal to or exceed the number of available seats, for the election to be held in a neighbourhood.
