= Prawobrzeże =

Coordinates: 53°25′05″N 14°40′16″E

- District
- Interactive map of Prawobrzeże
- Country: Poland
- Voivodeship: West Pomeranian
- County/City: Szczecin

Area
  - Total: 149.0 km^{2} (57.5 sq mi)

Population (2019)
  - Total: 81,027
  - Density: 543.8/km^{2} (1,408/sq mi)
- Time zone: UTC+1 (CET)
  - Summer (DST): UTC+2 (CEST)
- Area code: +48 91
- Car plates: ZS

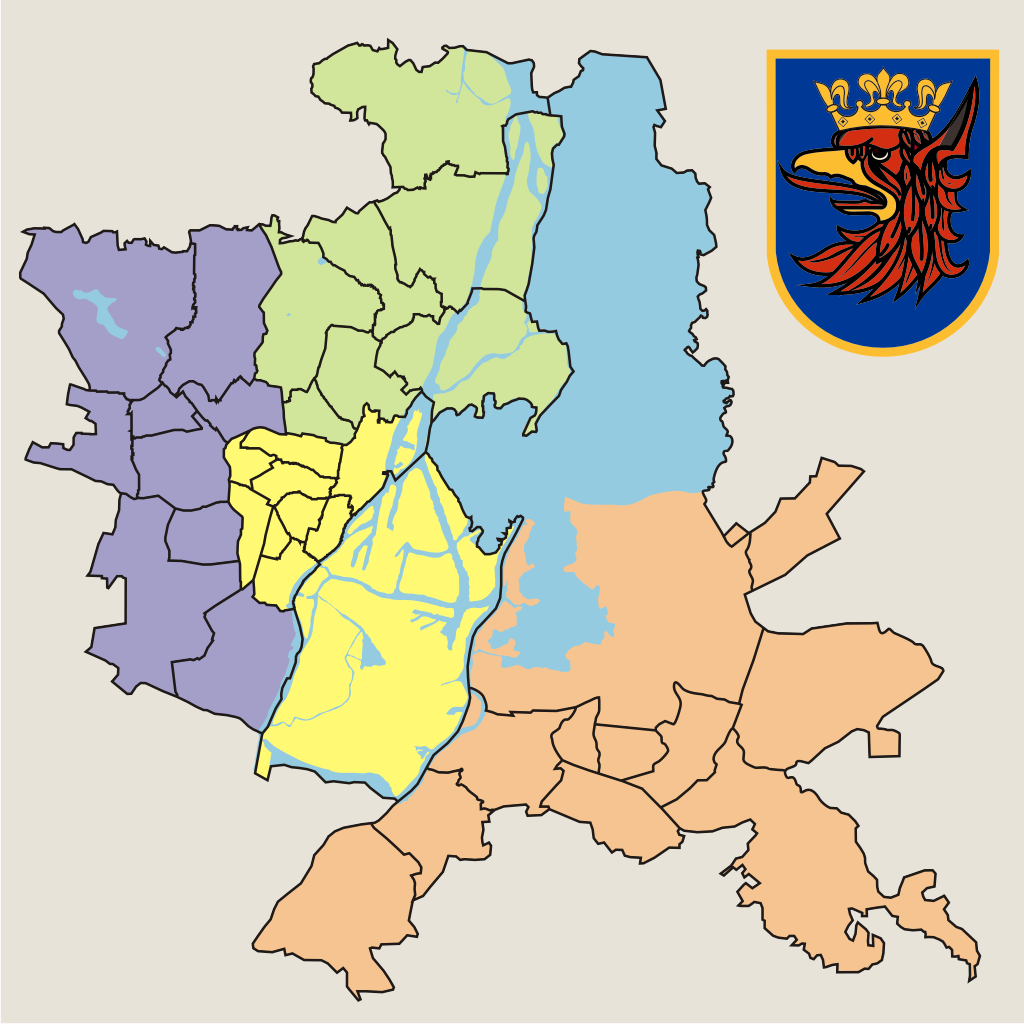
Districts of Szczecin: Śródmieście Zachód Północ Prawobrzeże

Prawobrzeże (lit. Right Bank) is one of four districts (Polish: dzielnica) of Szczecin, Poland situated on the right bank of Oder river in eastern part of the city. As of December 2019 it had a population of 81,027.

Prawobrzeże is divided into 11 municipal neighbourhoods:

- Bukowe-Klęskowo
- Dąbie
- Kijewo
- Majowe
- Płonia-Śmierdnica-Jezierzyce
- Podjuchy
- Słoneczne
- Wielgowo-Sławociesze
- Załom
- Zdroje
- Żydowce-Klucz
