= Śródmieście (former district of Szczecin) =

Former district of the city of Szczecin from 1954 to 1976

- District of Szczecin
- 1954–1976
- Śródmieście within Szczecin in 1965.
- Capital: Szczecin
- Area
  - 1955: 42 km^{2} (16 sq mi)
  - 1958: 43 km^{2} (17 sq mi)
  - 1961: 49 km^{2} (19 sq mi)
- Population
  - 1961: 143 039
  - Type: District
- History
  - Established: 7 October 1954
  - Disestablished: 19 November 1976
- Contained within
  - Country: Polish People's Republic
  - Voivodeship: Szczecin (1954–1975); Szczecin (1975–1976)
  - County: Szczecin (1954–1975)
  - Gmina: Szczecin
Preceded by	Succeeded by
Szczecin	Szczecin

Śródmieście (Note: Translation from Polish: Centre) was a district of the city of Szczecin, Poland, that functioned from 1954 to 1976.

== History ==
Śródmieście was established on 7 October 1954, as one of four district of the city of Szczecin, Poland. The other three districts were: Dąbie, Nad Odrą, and Pogodno. It bordered Pogodno to the west, Nad Odrą to the north, and Dąbie to the east. In 1961, it incorporated the district of Pomorzany from Pogodno. In 1955, it had an area of 42 square metres (450 sq ft), in 1958, 43 square metres (460 sq ft), and in 1961, 49 square metres (530 sq ft). In 1961, it was inhabited by 143 039 people. It existed until 19 November 1976, when the district were abolished.

The city was again divided into districts in 1990. The former area of Śródmieście was divided between Śródmieście, and Zachód.

== Subdivisions ==
The district was subdivided into 6 administrative neighbourhoods.

Neighbourhood	Population (1960)
Grabowo	11 038
Łasztownia-Port	2668
Niebuszewo I	18 586
Pomorzany	6225
Śródmieście	103 175
Wyspa Pucka-Kępa Parnicka	1317
