= Bezrzecze, Police County =

Hamlet in West Pomeranian Voivodeship, Poland

Bezrzecze
- Hamlet
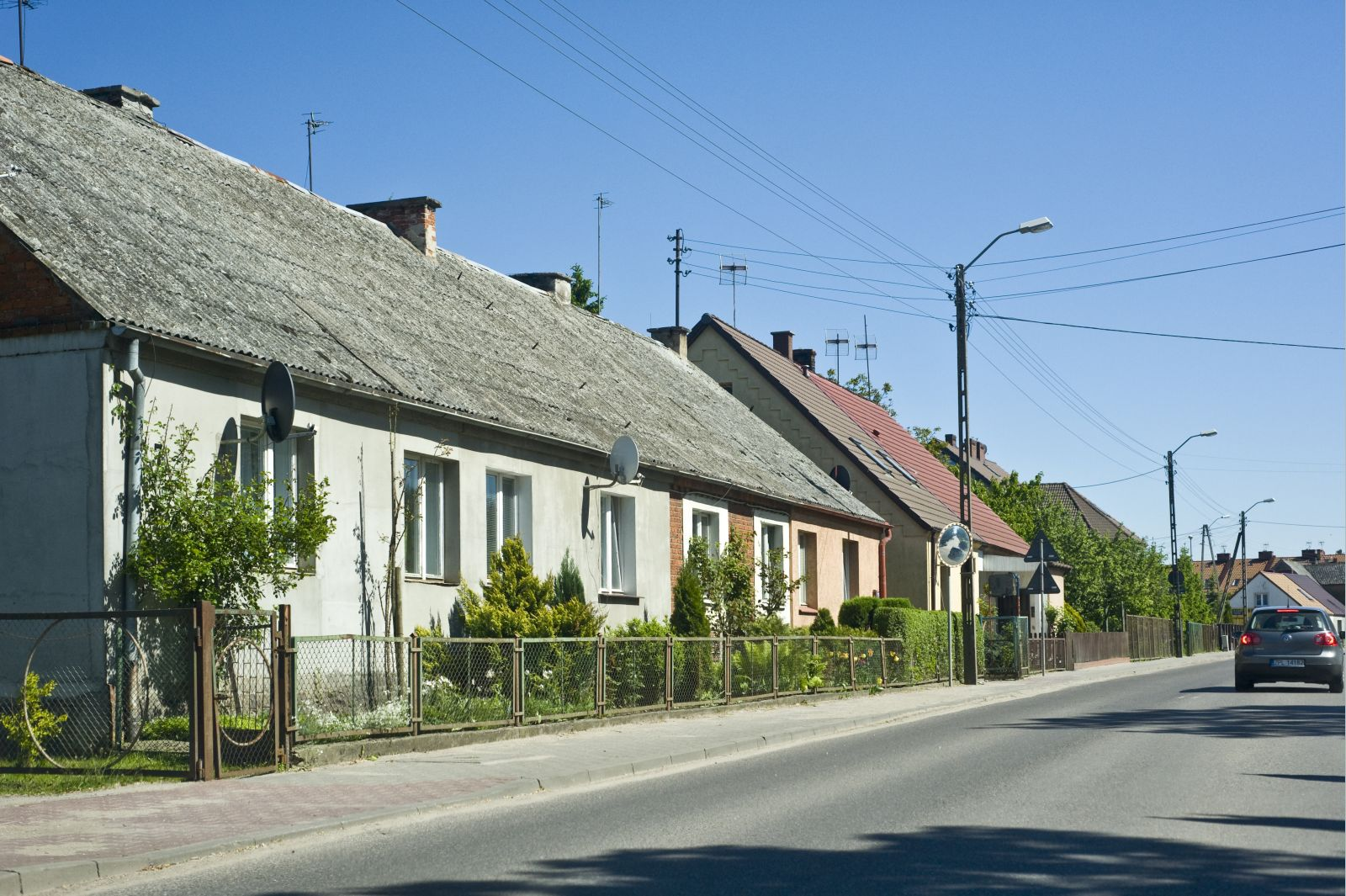
- The houses on Górna Street in Bezrzecze.

- Location within West Pomeranian Voivodeship Location within Poland
- Coordinates: 53°27′27″N 14°27′21″E
- Country: Poland
- Voivodeship: West Pomeranian
- County: Police
- Municipality: Dobra Szczecińska
- Elevation: 67.8 m (222 ft)

Population (2021)
  - Total: 6,209
- Time zone: UTC+1 (CET)
  - Summer (DST): UTC+2 (CEST)
- Postal code: 71-219, 71-220
- Area code: +48 91
- Car plates: ZPL

Bezrzecze (Polish: [bɛzˈʐɛ.t͡ʂɛ]; German until 1945: Brunn, [ˈbʁʊn]), also known as Bezrzecze Górne (Polish pronunciation: [bɛzˈʐɛ.t͡ʂɛ ˈɡur.nɛ], lit. 'Upper Bezrzecze'), is a hamlet in West Pomeranian Voivodeship, Poland, located within the municipality of Dobra Szczecińska in Police County. It forms a residential suburb of the nearby city of Szczecin, which borders it to the east. It is adjacent to its neighborhoods of Bezrzecze and Krzekowo. In 2021, the hamlet had a population of 6,209 people. The hamlet includes the Our Lady of the Rosary Church, a historic Late Gothic and Gothic Revival Roman Catholic parish church dating from the late 15th century.

The oldest known artifacts of human activity in the area date to the Mesolithic period, while the oldest known settlements date to the Neolithic period. Later, it also included a settlement of the Lusatian culture, and later the Hallstatt culture, during the Bronze Age, as well as a small settlement at the turn of the 10th century. The oldest known records of the hamlet of Bezrzecze, then a small farming community, date to 1260. It was plundered and destroyed in 1480 in a raid by the Margraviate of Brandenburg, in 1630 and 1636 during the Dano–Swedish War, and in 1677 during the Thirty Years' War. In 1954, its eastern portion was incorporated into the city of Szczecin, forming the neighbourhood of Bezrzecze. The hamlet remained rural until the 1990s, when it developed into a residential suburb.

== Toponymy ==
The name Bezrzecze comes from Polish words "bez rzeki", meaning "without a river". It was first recorded in 1260 in a Germanised form Beseritz (German: [bəˈzɛ.ʁɪt͡s]). Later, it became known by the German name Brunn, from the Alemannic German term "Brunne", meaning "spring", referring to the nearby spring of the Bukowa stream. It was recorded as Brunnek in 1266, Brunnecke in 1271, and Brunne in 1277. In 1946, after it was incorporated into Poland, its name was reverted to the historic Polish name Bezrzecze.

Between 1945 and 1946, before the official name was established, it was provisionally referred in Polish as Broń (Polish: [ˈbrɔɲ]) and Zdrój (Polish: [ˈzdruj]). The former, directly translating to the word "weapon", was adopted due to the relative phonetic similarity to the former German name, while the latter was a direct calque of the German name, meaning a "spring".

Due to sharing the same name with the neighbourhood of Bezrzecze, located nearby in the city of Szczecin, the hamlet is also sometimes alternatively called Bezrzecze Górne, meaning "Upper Bezrzecze". The names refer to their respective elevations, with the hamlet being at a higher altitude than the neighbourhood. The latter is accordingly referred to as Bezrzecze Dolne (Polish: [bɛzˈʐɛ.t͡ʂɛ ˈdɔl.nɛ]), meaning "Lower Bezrzecze".

== History ==
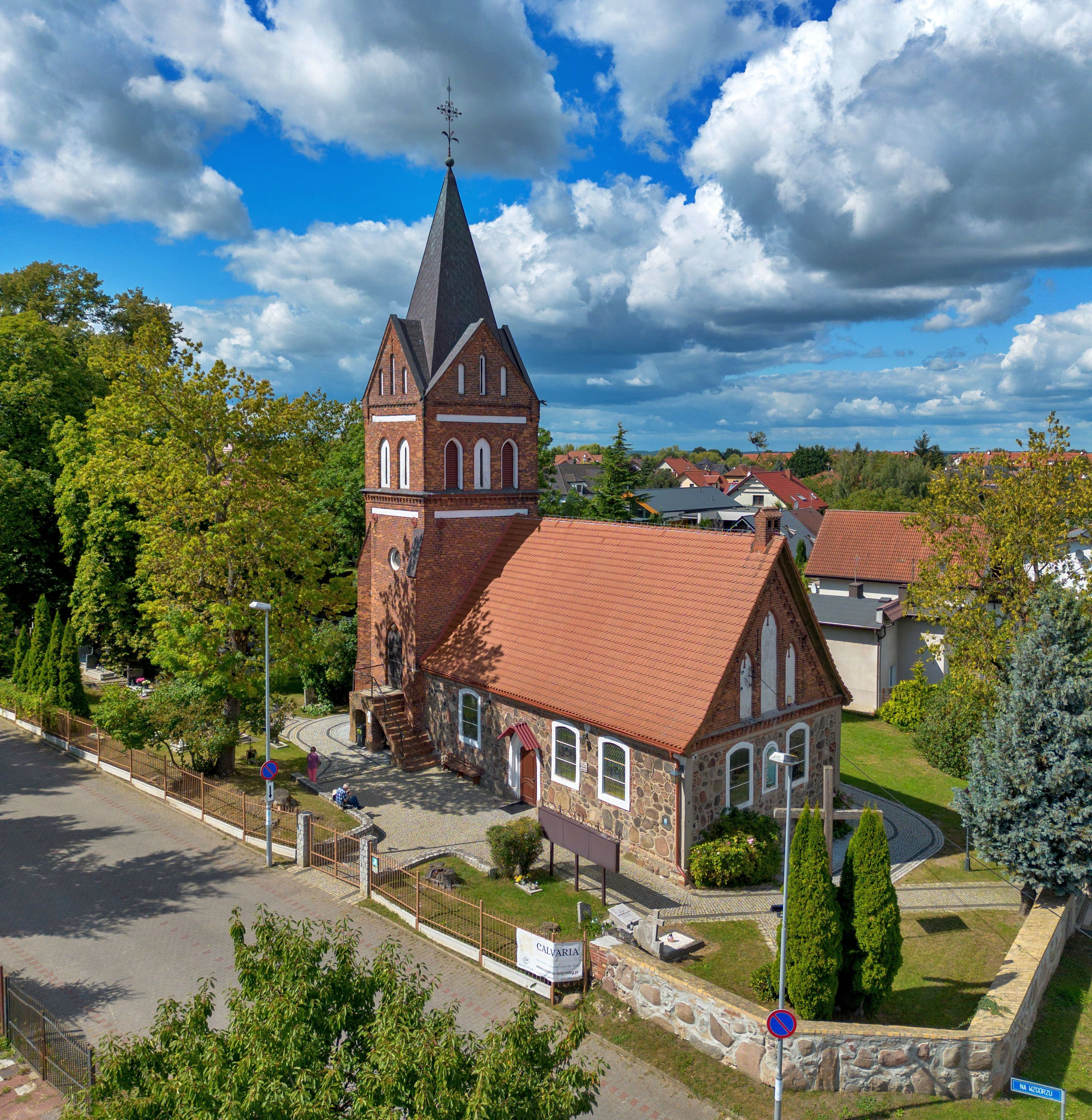
The Our Lady of the Rosary Church in Bezrzecze, built in the late 15th century.

The artifacts of human activity from the Mesolithic period were discovered in the area. It featured four human settlements in the Neolithic period, present alongside Bukowa stream, as well as a large settlement of the Lusatian culture, and later the Hallstatt culture, during the Bronze Age. Around 160 ceramic pieces and a glass beaded necklace, dating to the latter period, were found in the area. A dugout canoe of an unspecified age was also found in Bezrzecze. At the turn of the 10th century, a small settlement was present in the area of the current Szeroka Street.

The oldest records of the hamlet of Bezrzecze date to 1260. In 1266, duke Barnim I, the ruler of the Duchy of Pomerania-Stettin, granted the ownership of the hamlet, together with 53 voloks (951.62 ha) of land, to the St. Mary Church in the nearby city of Szczecin. It was approved the next year by Hermann von Gleichen, the bishop of Cammin. In 1269, a portion of the land of Bezrzecze was granted to brothers Godekin and Heinemann von Saltzwedel, and a year later, 10 voloks (179.55 ha) of land was given to Dietrich von Saltzwedel.

By the 13th century, Bezrzecze included a Roman Catholic church building, the administration of which was granted to the St. Mary Church in Szczecin in 1286 by bishop Hermann von Gleichen. It was burned down in 1480, in a raid by the soldiers from the Margraviate of Brandenburg, and was rebuilt later that century, with a Late Gothic structure made from granite stones. In the 16th century, its denomination was changed to Lutheranism during the Protestant Reformation. In the 1890s, it was expanded with the addition of a Gothic Revival bell tower. Its denomination was changed back again to Roman Catholicism after 1945, under the name Our Lady of the Rosary Church, and became a parish church in 1997.

Following the secularisation of the church lands in the Duchy of Pomerania, Bezrzecze was granted as a fiefdom by duke Bogislaw X to knight Henning Lindstedt from Hagen in 1480. In 1527, it belonged to Vivigenzow I von Eickstedt, and in 1589, it was acquired by Otto von Ramin, a chancellor in the Duchy of Pomerania-Stettin, who came from the Ramin family, which belonged to the regional aristocracy.

In 1630, during the Thirty Years' War and the Dano–Swedish War, the Swedish Imperial Army based a garrison at the outskirts of Szczecin. A manor house in Bezrzecze was used as the temporary headquarters and residence of king Gustavus Adolphus and his officers. The residents fled the hamlet, with the houses being deconstructed by the soldiers as a source of wood for the construction of a military camp. Western Pomerania was recaptured in 1635, with a garrison of the Imperial Army of the Holy Roman Emperor stationed in Bezrzecze until 1636, under the command of field marshal general Rodolfo Giovanni Marazzino. Bezrzecze was again plundered by the military, and was later recaptured by the Swedish military in 1636, which stationed there until 1639.

Following the death of Otto von Ramin in 1641, Bezrzecze was inherited by his wife, Armigard von Ramin, who financed the reconstruction of the hamlet and the plundered manor house . Bezrzecze and its manor house were again plundered and burned down on 20 October 1657, by the Crown Army of the Polish–Lithuanian Commonwealth, under the command of field crown hetman Stefan Czarniecki. They were rebuilt, being financed by Armigard von Ramin, and her brother-in-law Adam Friedrich von Bornstedt. The hamlet was once again burned down in 1677 during the siege of Stettin in the Scanian War. Both Armigard von Ramin and Adam Friedrich von Bornstedt died in 1677.

In 1692, Bezrzecze housed seven landowners. In the 18th century, farmers from the nearby hamlet of Krzekowo leased the pastures in Bezrzecze, paying 16 bushels of rye (1025.28 litres) annually. The owner of the hamlet held the exclusive right to fish in the nearby Głębokie Lake. Due to the large presence of fish such as northern pike, European perch, and Common rudds, the city of Szczecin, as well as residents of Krzekowo contested the exclusivity in the court against the Ramin family.

In the 18th century, Bezrzecze included a brickworks, which produced 140,000 bricks annually. The marl, medicinal clay, and peat were also excavated in the area. In 1828, Bezrzecze was granted the status of the knight estate. In the first half of the 19th century, the landed estate of Bezrzecze, which also included the nearby hamlets of Gunice and Stangenhorst, had an area of 4,592 Magdeburg morgen (1172.44 ha), the majority of which consisted of farmlands, dedicated to the cultivation of wheat, rye, oat, beans, and potatoes. The hamlet itself measured 480 Magdeburg morgen (122.55 ha), and its population included four landowners, each of whom owned 120 Magdeburg morgen (30.64 ha). In 1892, the estate of Bezrzecze, together with Głębokie and Stangenhorst, had an area of 1,013 ha, including 346 ha of farmlands, 84 ha of meadows, and 81 ha of pastures. The woods covered 462 ha, and the water covered 40 ha. In 1894, Bezrzecze had a population of 260 people in 20 households. The majority of its residents were of Lutheran faith, with the settlement also including seven followers of Judaism. It also included a primary school.

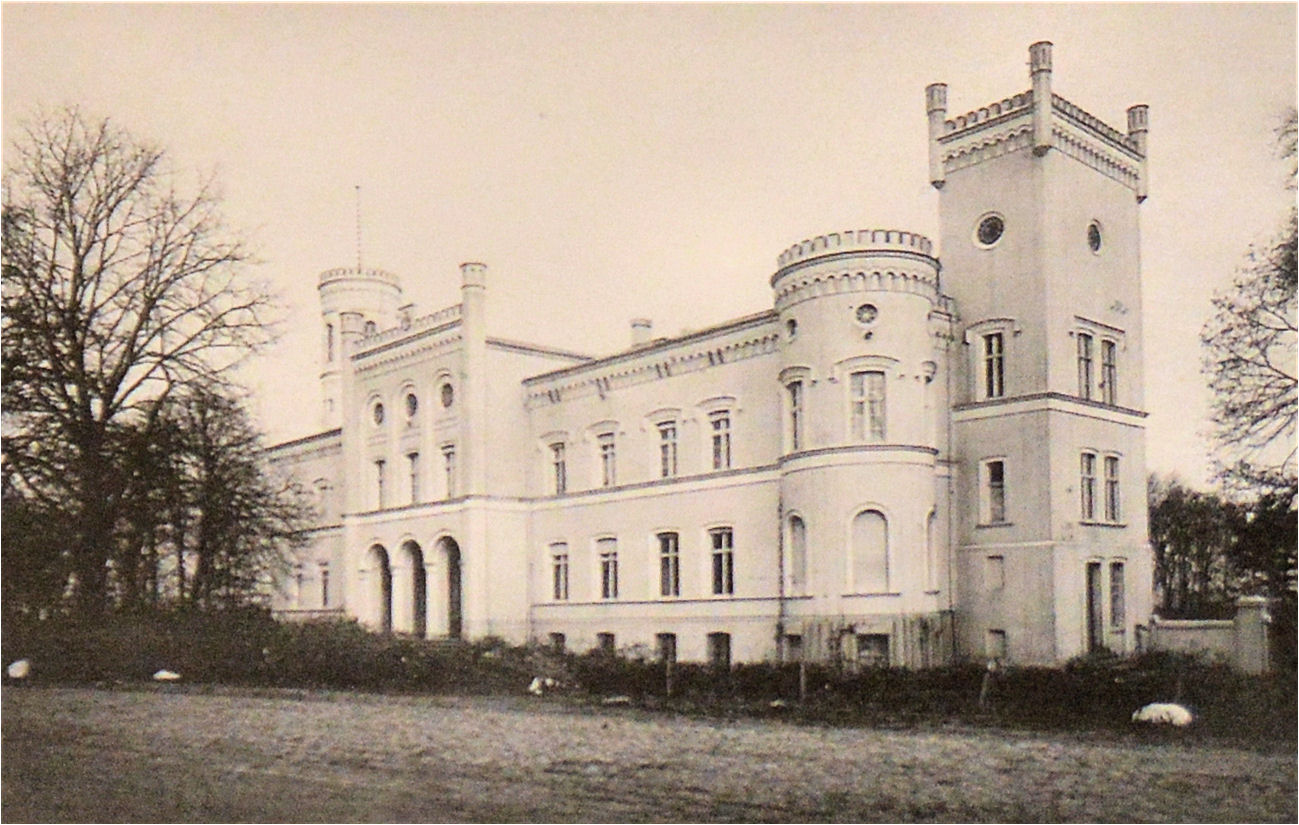
The Bezrzecze Palace, built in 1880, and burned down in 1946.

In 1880, a Baroque Revival palace was built in Bezrzecze for its administrator, Otto Friedrich Gebhard von Ramin, in place of the former manor house of the Ramin family. It burned down in 1946. Its garden complex has been preserved to the present day, being included on the regional heritage list.

During the interwar period, a suburb of single-family houses was developed to the east of Bezrzecze, between the current Modra, Rozmarynowa, and Zaściankowa Streets. In 1932, the timber-framed houses, situated next to the settlement administrator building, were demolished. In 1939, aside from the Ramin family's estate, the hamlet also included another landed estate, with an area of 42 ha, owned by Elsbeth Meyer. Bezrzecze had a population of 244 people in 1925, and 249 people in 1933.

On 15 October 1939, Bezrzecze was incorporated into the city of Szczecin. At the time, it had a population of 1,217 residents. The hamlet survived the Second World War undamaged. It was captured by the 2nd Shock Army of the 2nd Belorussian Front, a part of the Red Army of the Soviet Union on 26 April 1945. The city was placed under the Polish administration on 5 July 1945, while its suburbs, including Bezrzecze, were placed under Soviet military occupation. The area was returned under the Polish control on 4 October 1945. The German population either left or was forced out from the city, and was replaced by Polish settlers. The area, which land predominantly constituted the property of the Ramin family, was confiscated and nationalised by the government. On 5 October 1954, the eastern side of the hamlet was reincorporated into the city, with the boundaries being marked by Drozdowa, Kirasjerów, Koralowa, Poranna, Wronia, and Zaściankowa Streets, together with the adjacent building, forming the neighbourhood of Bezrzecze. It also became alternatively known as Bezrzecze Dolne (lit. 'Lower Bezrzecze'), while the remaining hamlet became known as Bezrzecze Górne (lit. 'Upper Bezrzecze'). The historic church, as well as the garden complex of the former Bezrzecze Palace, remained within the hamlet.

In 1945, a state agricultural farm, which was a part of the system of the government-owned collective farming complexes, was opened in Bezrzecze, operating there until 1992. A new primary school was also opened in 1946. In the 1980s, Bezrzecze had over eight hundred residents. It remained as a rural settlement until the 1990s, when it began undergoing urbanisation, developing into a residential suburb of Szczecin.

== Characteristics ==
The hamlet of Bezrzecze forms a residential suburb bordering the city of Szczecin, centered on Górna and Koralowa Streets. It is adjucent the neighbourhoods of Bezrzecze and Krzekowo. The area consists of the low-rise single-family detached and semi-detached homes and terraced houses. The settlement includes the Our Lady of the Rosary Church, a historic Late Gothic and Gothic Revival Roman Catholic parish church dating to the late 15th century, located at 9 Górna Street. The settlement lies on the peak and sides of the Stobno Ridge, a moraine hill, with the highest altitude of 67.8 m (222 ft). The settlement also includes the spring of the Bukowa stream, which flows to the east and later to the south, towards the Oder river. It also includes two small ponds.

== Demography ==
Historical population
Year	1894	1925	1933	1939	2003	2004	2005	2006	2007	2008	2016	2020	2021
Pop.	260	244	249	1,217	1,398	1,497	1,624	1,804	2,008	2,135	4,408	5,228	6,209
±%	—	−6.2%	+2.0%	+388.8%	+14.9%	+7.1%	+8.5%	+11.1%	+11.3%	+6.3%	+106.5%	+18.6%	+18.8%
