= Osiedle Słoneczne =

Neighbourhood of Szczecin, Poland

- Municipal neighbourhood
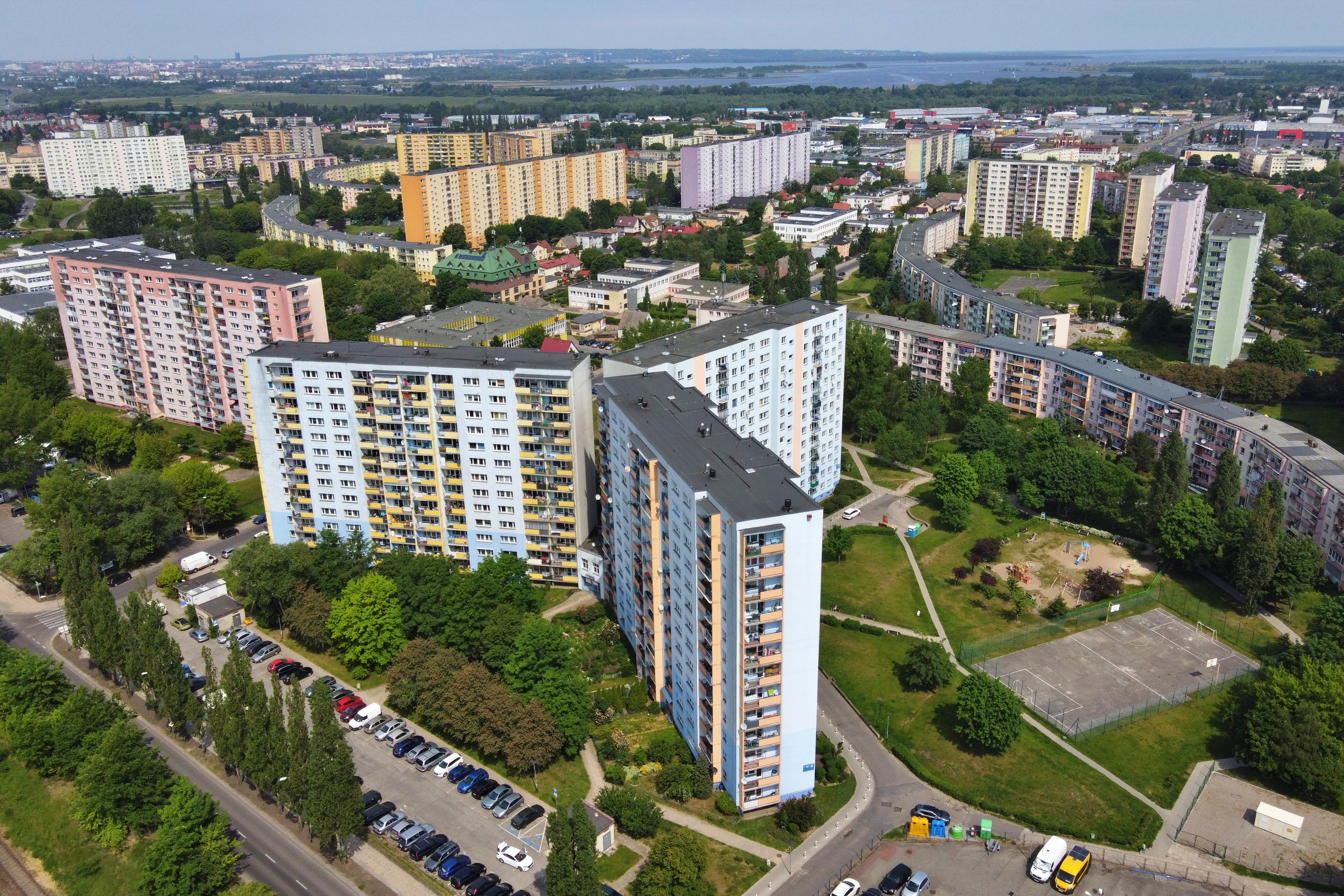
- The apartment buildings in Osiedle Słoneczne in 2021.

- Location within Szczecin
- Coordinates: 53°22′53.76″N 14°39′11.52″E
- Country: Poland
- Voivodeship: West Pomeranian
- City and county: Szczecin
- District: Right Bank
- Establishment: 1974
- Seat: 49 Rydla Street

Area
  - Total: 1.4 km^{2} (0.54 sq mi)

Population (2025)
  - Total: 11,365
  - Density: 8,100/km^{2} (21,000/sq mi)
- Time zone: UTC+1 (CET)
  - Summer (DST): UTC+2 (CEST)
- Area code: +48 91
- Car plates: ZS

Osiedle Słoneczne (Polish: [ɔˈɕɛ.dlɛ swɔˈnɛt͡ʂ.nɛ]; lit. 'Sunny Estate') is a municipal neighborhood of the city of Szczecin, Poland, within the district of Right Bank. It is a housing estate consisting of apartment buildings. It has an area of 1.4 km^{2}, and in 2022, it had a population of 11,365 people. The neighbourhood was founded in 1974.

== Toponomy ==
The name Osiedle Słoneczne translates from Polish to mean the Sunny Estate or the Sunny Neighbourhood. It is sometimes also simply referred to as Słoneczne.

== History ==
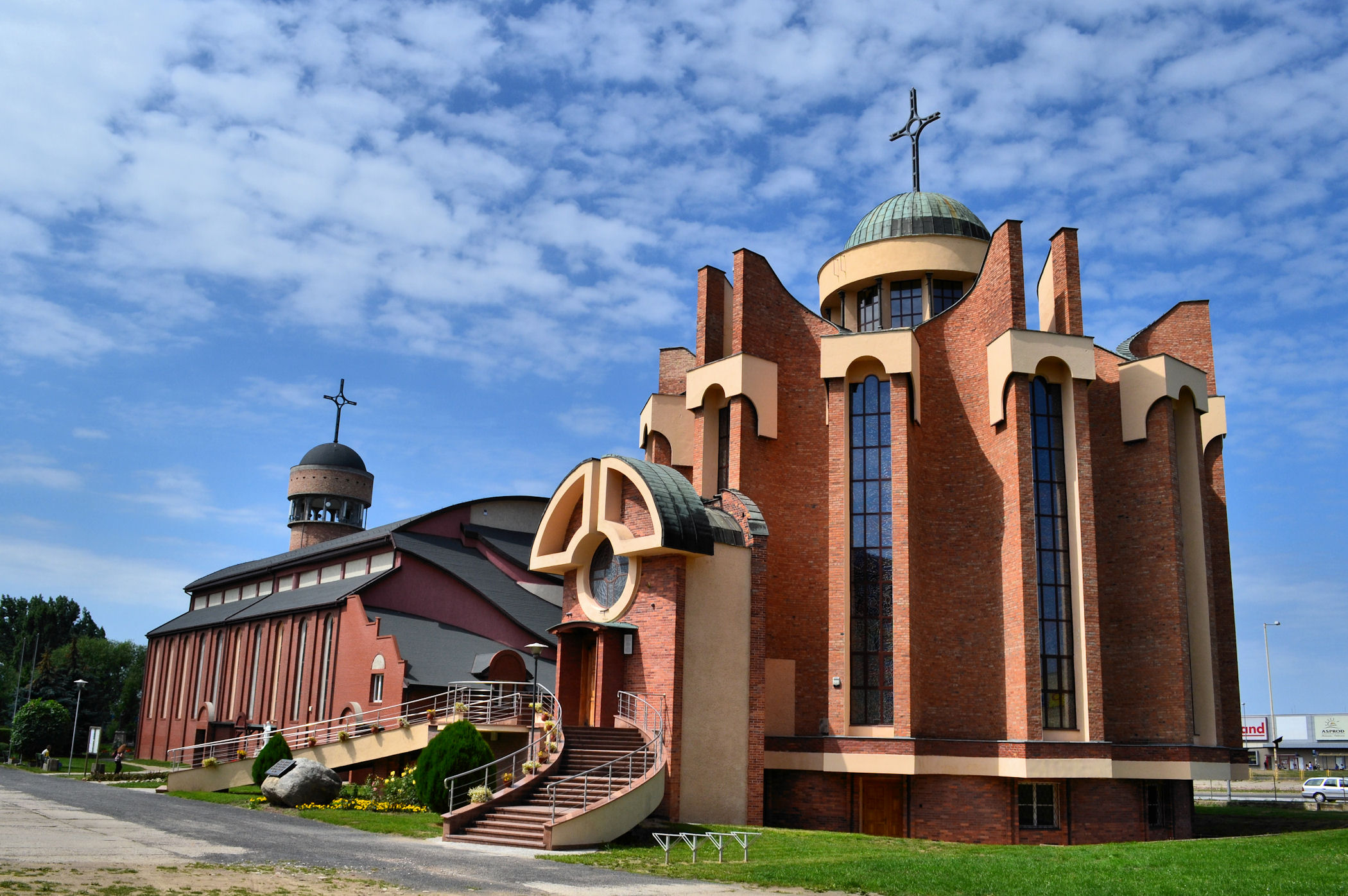
The Our Lady of Fátima Sanctuary opened in 1988.

In 1974, the housing estate of 5- and 13-storey-tall apartment buildings, named Osiedle Słoneczne (lit. 'Sunny Estate'), was developed in the area between Jasna, Rydla, Kostki Napierskiego, and Łubinowej Streets. It was designed by a team of architects led by Romuald Cerebież-Tarabicki. The housing estate of Osiedle Majowe was simultaneously developed to its east. In 1978, at 10 Struga Street, was opened the Dąbie bus garage, currently operated by Szczecińskie Przedsiębiorstwo Autobusowe "Dąbie".

Between 1982 and 1985, the Szczecin Słoneczne railway station operated at the corner of Handlowa and Przelotowa Streets.

In 1988, the Our Lady of Fátima Sanctuary, a Catholic parish church, was opened at 61 Rydla Street.

In 1990, following the administrative reform in the city, Osiedle Słoneczne became one of its administrative units governed by locally elected council.

In 2001, the Independence Memorial, designed by designed Jerzy T. Lipczyński, Przemysław Biryło, Tomasz Flejterski, and Wojciech Kokowski, was unveiled at 105 Jasna Street, near the Runy Pond. It has a form of stainless steel sculpture, representing the past, the presence, and the future of Poland.

== Characteristics ==
Osiedle Słoneczne is a housing estate consists of 5- and 13-storey-tall apartment buildings. It features the Our Lady of Fátima Sanctuary, a Catholic parish church, located at 61 Rydla Street. It also includes Ruby Pond, and the Independence Memorial, a stainless steel sculpture representing the past, the presence, and the future of Poland, located at Jasna Street. Additionally, the Dąbie bus garage operated by Szczecińskie Przedsiębiorstwo Autobusowe "Dąbie" is located at 10 Struga Street.

== Government ==
Osiedle Słoneczne is one of the municipal neighbourhoods of Szczecin, governed by a locally elected council with 15 members. Its headquarters are located at 49 Rydla Street.

The neighbourhood is located between Wiosenna, Łubinowa, and Przelotowa Streets, and the railway tracks of lines no. 401 and 417. It borders Bukowe-Klęskowo, Dąbie, Osiedle Majowe, and Zdroje. It has a total area of 1.4 km^{2}.
