= Pogodno (former city district) =

Former district of the city of Szczecin from 1954 to 1976

- District of Szczecin
- 1954–1976
- Pogodno within Szczecin in 1965.
- Capital: Szczecin
- Area
  - 1955: 54 km^{2} (21 sq mi)
  - 1958: 57 km^{2} (22 sq mi)
  - 1961: 51 km^{2} (20 sq mi)
- Population
  - 1961: 65 821
  - Type: District
- History
  - Established: 7 October 1954
  - Disestablished: 19 November 1976
- Contained within
  - Country: Polish People's Republic
  - Voivodeship: Szczecin (1954–1975); Szczecin (1975–1976)
  - County: Szczecin (1954–1975)
  - Gmina: Szczecin
Preceded by	Succeeded by
Szczecin	Szczecin

Pogodno was a district of the city of Szczecin, Poland, that functioned from 1954 to 1976.

== History ==
Pogodno was established on 7 October 1954, as one of four district of the city of Szczecin, Poland. The other three districts were: Dąbie, Nad Odrą, and Śródmieście. It bordered Nad Odrą to the northeast, and Śródmieście to the southeast. In 1955, it had an area of 54 square metres (580 sq ft), in 1958, 57 square metres (610 sq ft), and in 1961, 51 square metres (550 sq ft). In 1961, it was inhabited by 65 821 people. It existed until 19 November 1976, when the district were abolished.

The city was again divided into districts in 1990. The former area of Pogodno was divided between Zachód, and Śródmieście.

== Subdivisions ==
The district was subdivided into 8 administrative neighbourhoods.

Neighbourhood	Population (1960)
Bezrzecze	719
Głębokie	1456
Gumieńce	9155
Krzekowo	1231
Niemierzyn	5644
Ossowo	968
Pogodno	30 030
Świerczewo	3714
