= Wielgowo-Sławociesze-Zdunowo =

- Municipal neighbourhood
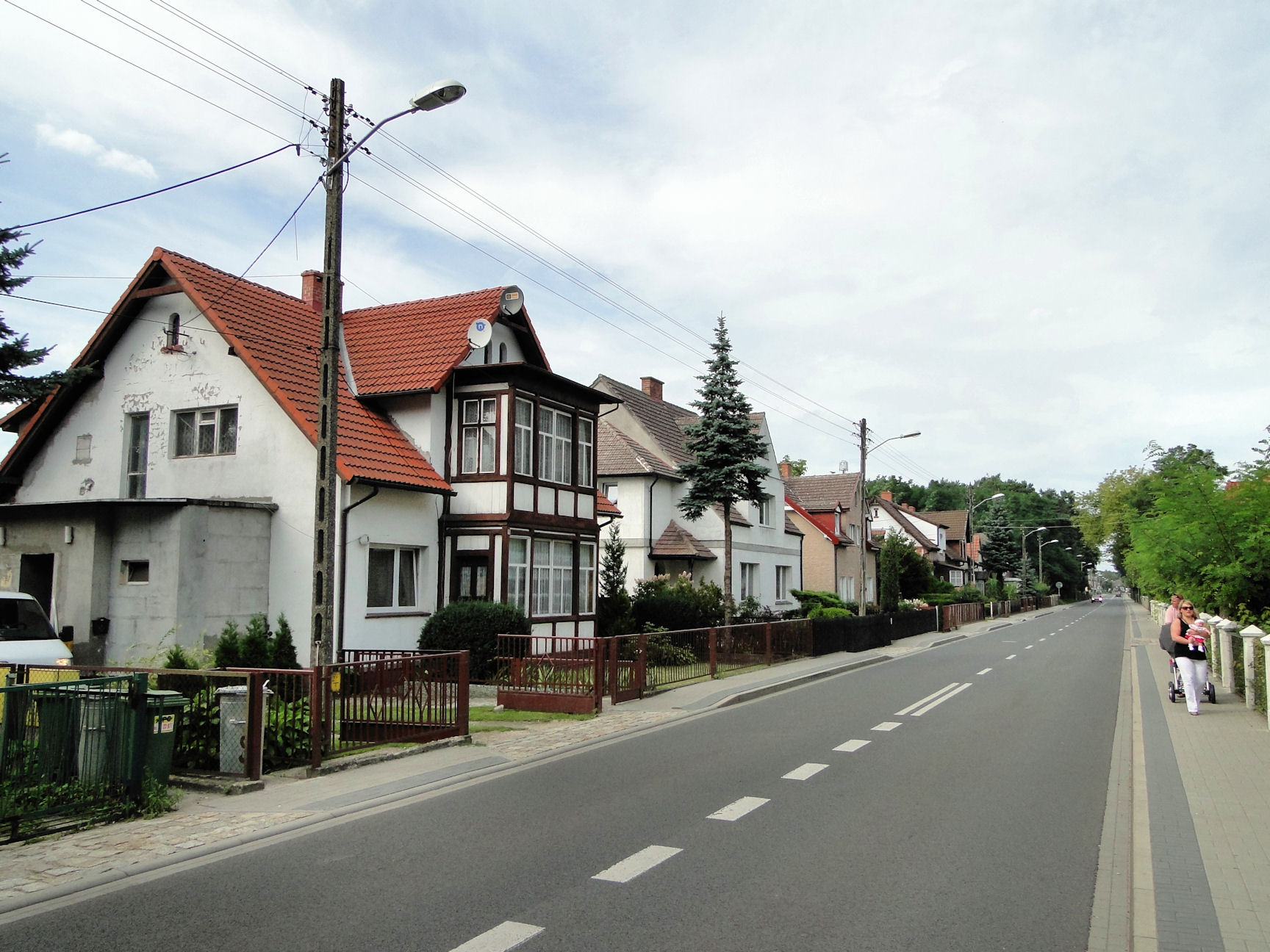
- Buildings in Wielgowo-Sławociesze-Zdunowo

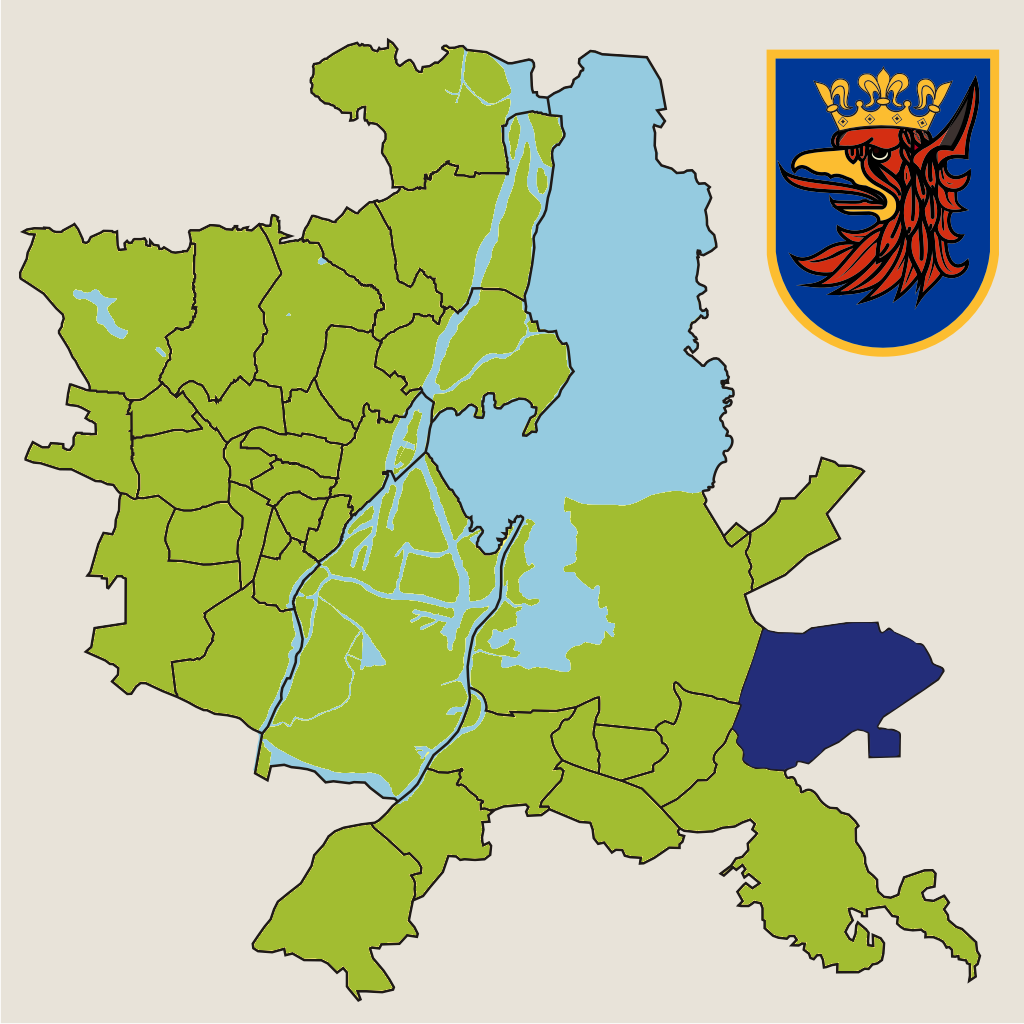
- Location of Wielgowo-Sławociesze-Zdunowo within Szczecin
- Coordinates: 53°23′10″N 14°45′50″E
- Country: Poland
- Voivodeship: West Pomeranian
- County/City: Szczecin

Population (2011)
  - Total: 3,741
- Time zone: UTC+1 (CET)
  - Summer (DST): UTC+2 (CEST)
- Area code: +48 91
- Car plates: ZS

Wielgowo-Sławociesze-Zdunowo is a municipal neighbourhood of the city of Szczecin, Poland situated on the right bank of Oder river, south-east of the Szczecin Old Town, and Middle Town. As of April 2011 it had a population of 3,741.

Wielgowo-Sławociesze comprises Wielgowo and Sławociesze.
