= Dąbie (former city district) =

Former district of the city of Szczecin from 1954 to 1976

- District of Szczecin
- 1954–1976
- Dąbie within Szczecin in 1965.
- Capital: Szczecin
- Area
  - 1955: 130 km^{2} (50 sq mi)
  - 1961: 128 km^{2} (49 sq mi)
- Population
  - 1961: 28 146
  - Type: District
- History
  - Established: 7 October 1954
  - Disestablished: 19 November 1976
- Contained within
  - Country: Polish People's Republic
  - Voivodeship: Szczecin (1954–1975); Szczecin (1975–1976)
  - County: Szczecin (1954–1975)
  - Gmina: Szczecin
Preceded by	Succeeded by
Szczecin	Szczecin

Dąbie (Polish: [ˈdɔm.bjɛ]) was a district of the city of Szczecin, Poland, that functioned from 1954 to 1976.

== History ==
Dąbie was established on 7 October 1954, as one of four district of the city of Szczecin, Poland. The other three districts were: Nad Odrą, Pogodno, and Śródmieście. It bordered Nad Odrą to the northwest, and Śródmieście to the southwest. In 1955, it had an area of 130 square metres (1,400 sq ft), and in 1961, 128 square metres (1,380 sq ft). In 1961, it was inhabited by 28 146 people. It existed until 19 November 1976, when the district were abolished.

The city was again divided into districts in 1990. Within the former area of the district was established Prawobrzeże.

== Subdivisions ==
The district was subdivided into 9 administrative neighbourhoods.

Neighbourhood	Population (1960)
Dąbie	7757
Kijewo	640
Klęskowo	2135
Klucz	1278
Podjuchy	6099
Sławociesze	675
Wielgowo-Zdunowo	2334
Zdroje	4125
Żydowce	2603
