= Nad Odrą =

District of Szczecin, Poland (1954–1976)

- District of Szczecin
- 1954–1976
- Nad Odrą within Szczecin in 1965.
- Capital: Szczecin
- Area
  - 1955: 54 km^{2} (21 sq mi)
  - 1961: 56 km^{2} (22 sq mi)
- Population
  - 1961: 33 992
  - Type: District
- History
  - Established: 7 October 1954
  - Disestablished: 19 November 1976
- Contained within
  - Country: Polish People's Republic
  - Voivodeship: Szczecin (1954–1975); Szczecin (1975–1976)
  - County: Szczecin (1954–1975)
  - Gmina: Szczecin
Preceded by	Succeeded by
Szczecin	Szczecin

Nad Odrą (Polish: [ˈnat ˈɔ.drɔw̃]; lit. 'next to the Oder river') was a district of the city of Szczecin, Poland, that functioned from 1954 to 1976.

== History ==
Nad Odrą was established on 7 October 1954, as one of four district of the city of Szczecin, Poland. The other three districts were: Dąbie, Pogodno, Śródmieście. It bordered Dąbie to the west, Pogodno to the west, and Śródmieście to the north. In 1955, it had an area of 54 square metres (580 sq ft), and in 1961, 56 square metres (600 sq ft). In 1961, it was inhabited by 33 992 people. It existed until 19 November 1976, when the district were abolished.

The city was again divided into districts in 1990. The former area of Nad Odrą, was divided between Północ, and Śródmieście.

== Subdivisions ==
The district was subdivided into 8 administrative neighbourhoods.

Neighbourhood	Population (1960)
Drzetowo	2562
Glinki-Stołczyn	6595
Gocław	800
Golęcin	5851
Niebuszewo II	5355
Skolwin	3924
Warszewo	2214
Żelechowo	5085
