= Kijewo, Szczecin =

Neighbourhood of Szczecin, Poland

Kijewo
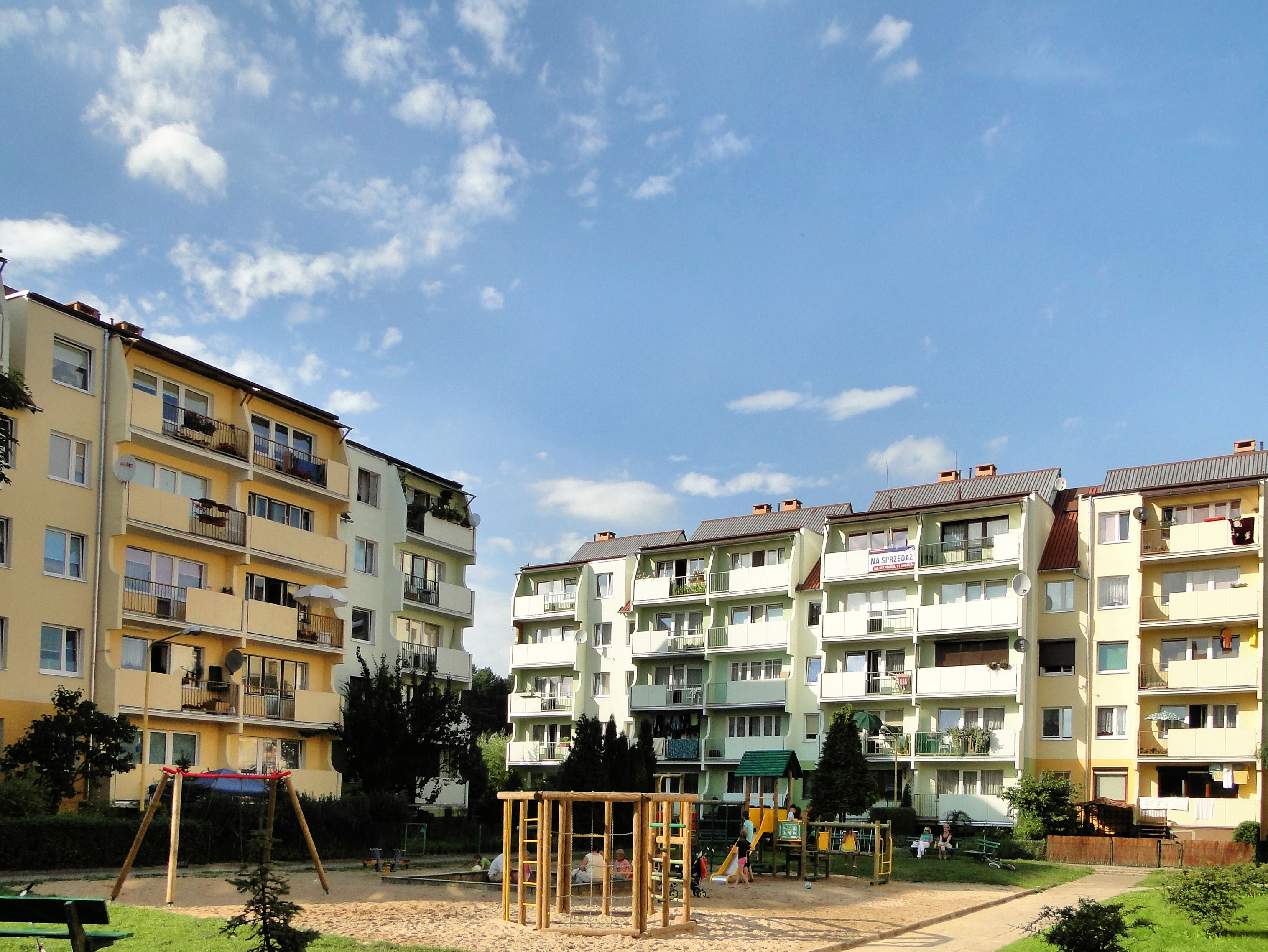

- Location of Kijewo in Szczecin
- Coordinates: 53.375°N 14.691°E
- Country: Poland
- Voivodeship: West Pomeranian
- County/City: Szczecin
- Time zone: UTC+1 (CET)
  - Summer (DST): UTC+2 (CEST)
- Vehicle registration: ZS

Kijewo is a municipal neighbourhood of the city of Szczecin, Poland, situated on the right bank of the Oder River, east of the Szczecin Old Town and south-east of Szczecin-Dąbie. As of December 2019, it had a population of 3,515.

The area became part of the emerging Duchy of Poland under its first ruler Mieszko I around 967, and following Poland's fragmentation in 1138, it formed part of the Duchy of Pomerania. During the Thirty Years' War, the settlement fell to the Swedish Empire. From 1871, it was part of Germany until the defeat of Nazi Germany in World War II in 1945 when this area was reintegrated back into Poland.
