= Sławociesze =

Neighbourhood of Szczecin, Poland

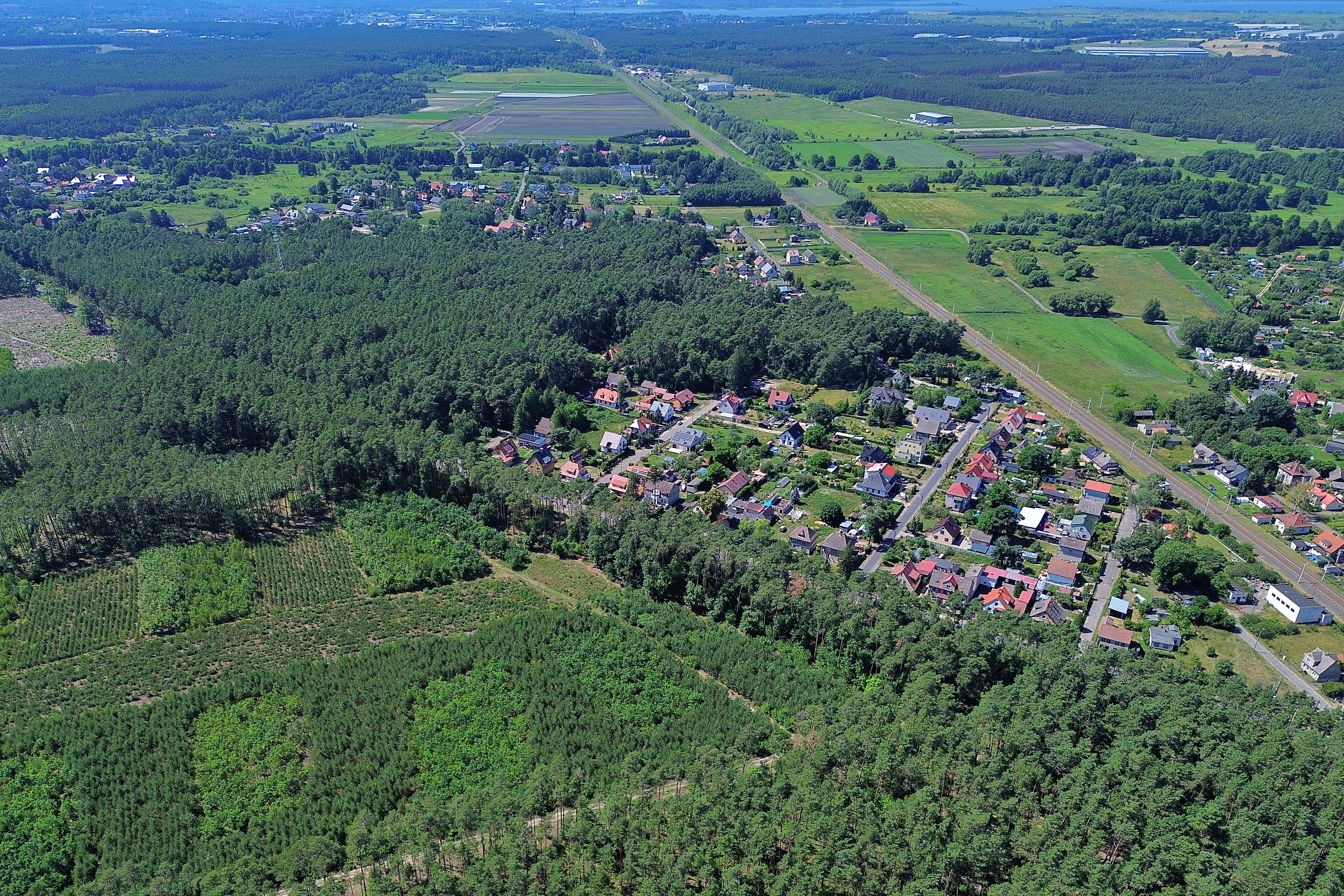
- Aerial view of Sławociesze

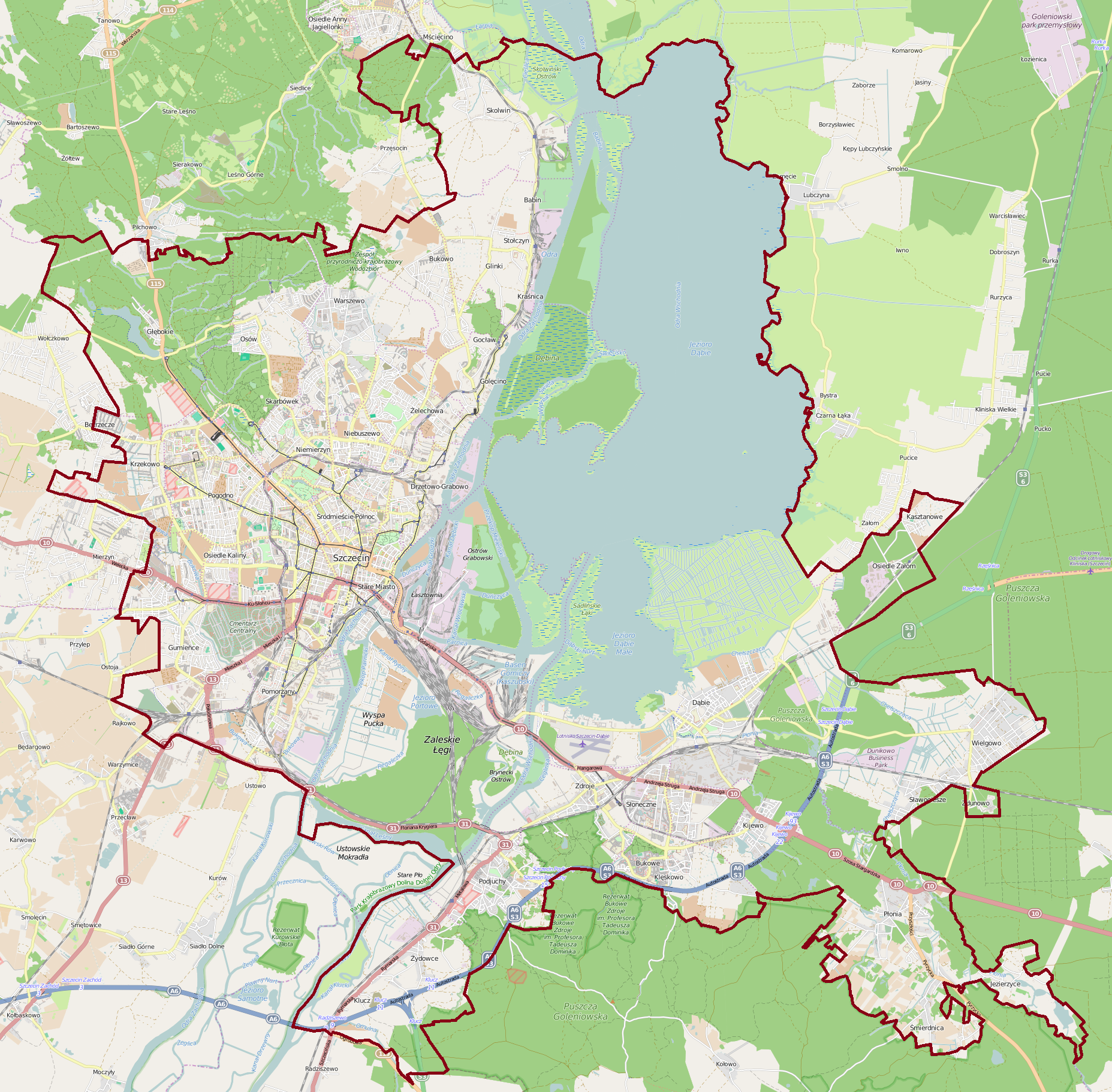
- Location within Szczecin Location within Poland
- Coordinates: 53.3902°N 14.7517°E
- Country: Poland
- Voivodeship: West Pomeranian
- County/City: Szczecin
- Time zone: UTC+1 (CET)
  - Summer (DST): UTC+2 (CEST)
- Vehicle registration: ZS

Sławociesze is a part of the city of Szczecin, Poland situated on the right bank of Oder river, east of the Szczecin Old Town, and Szczecin-Dąbie.

The area became part of the emerging Duchy of Poland under its first ruler Mieszko I around 967, and following Poland's fragmentation in 1138, it formed part of the Duchy of Pomerania. During the Thirty Years' War, the settlement fell to the Swedish Empire. Later on, it passed to Prussia, and from 1871 to 1945 it was part of Germany, within which it was known as Franzhausen. In 1945, the area became part of Poland.
