= Śródmieście, Szczecin =

Śródmieście
- District
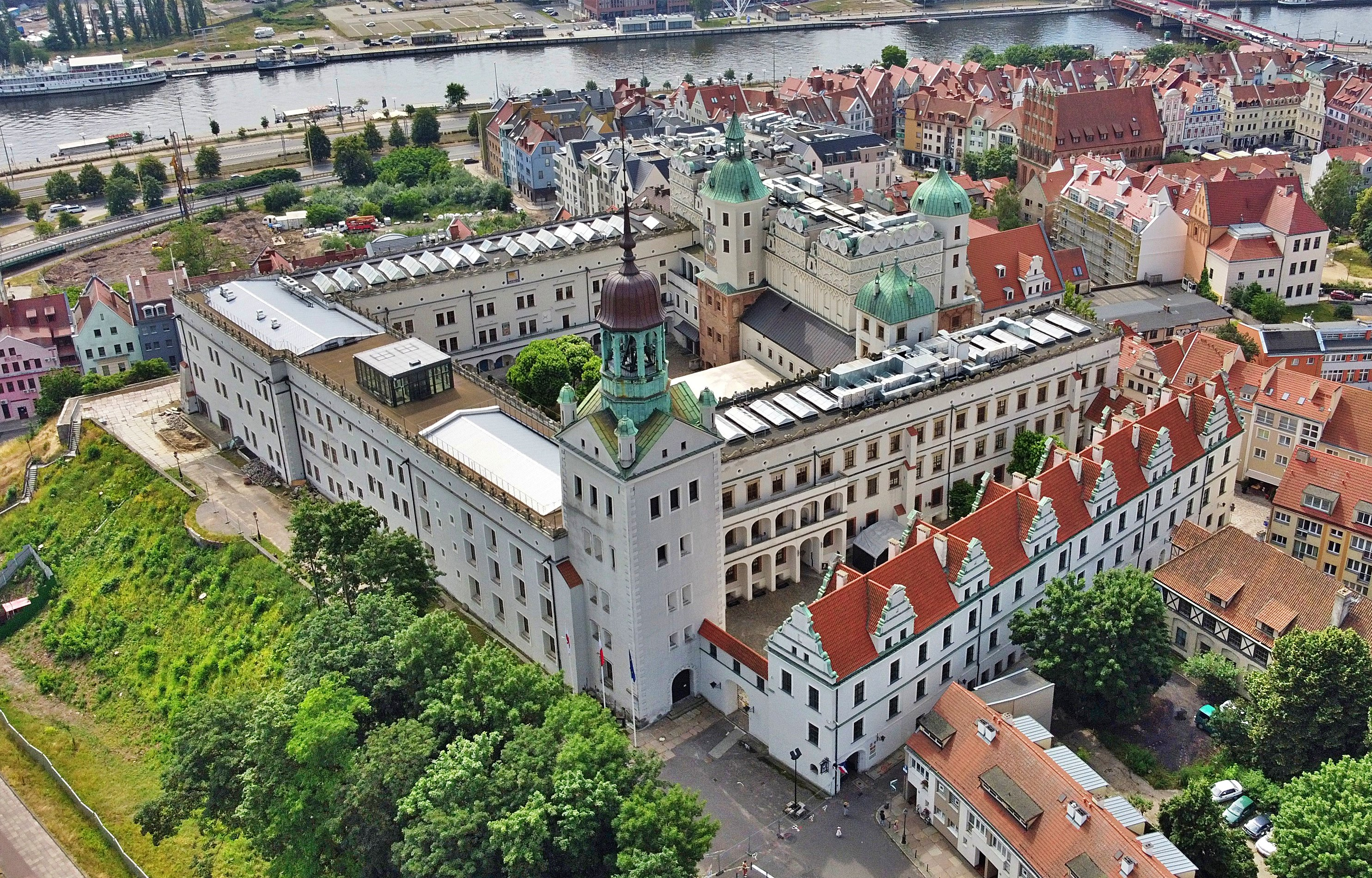
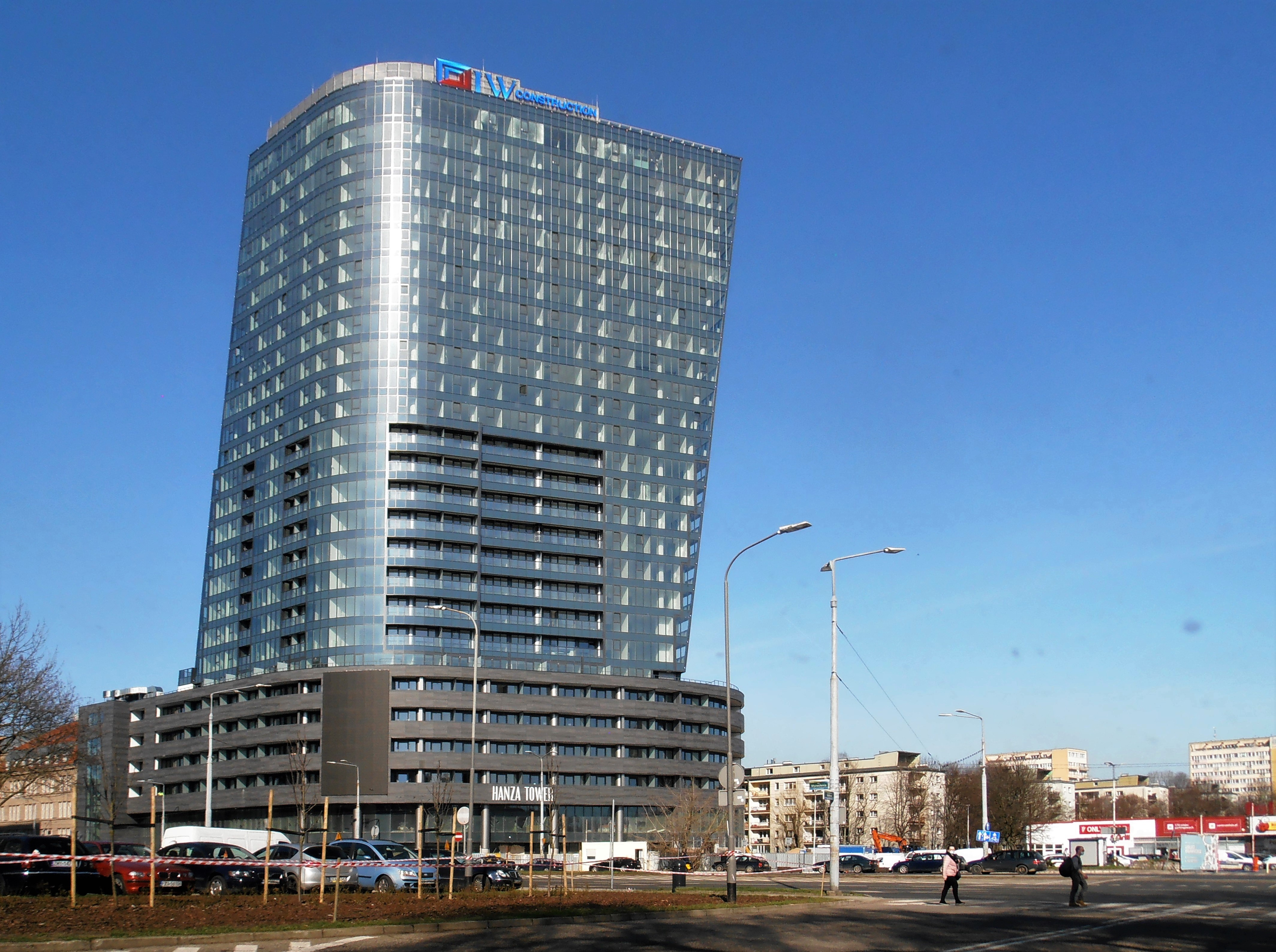
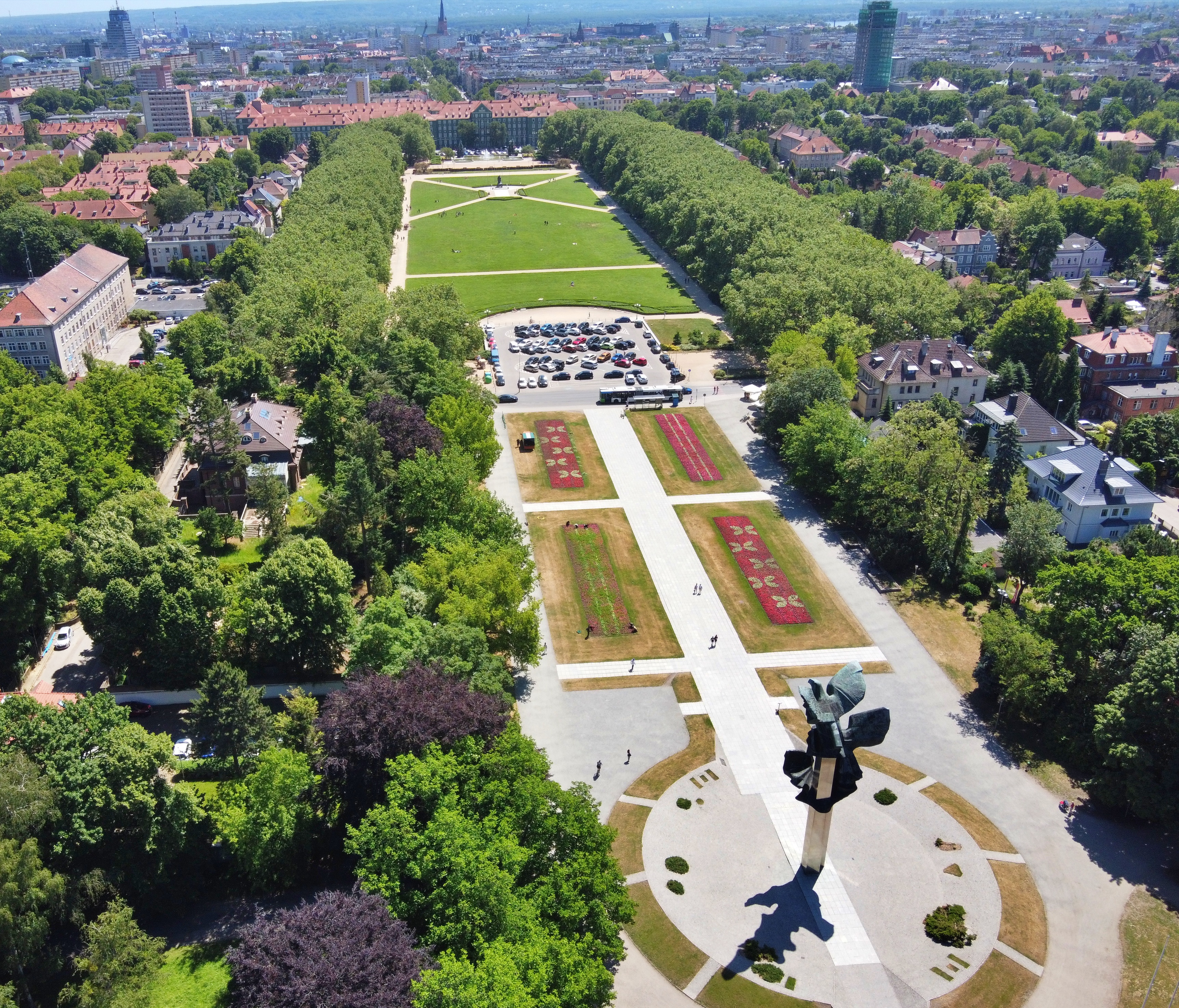
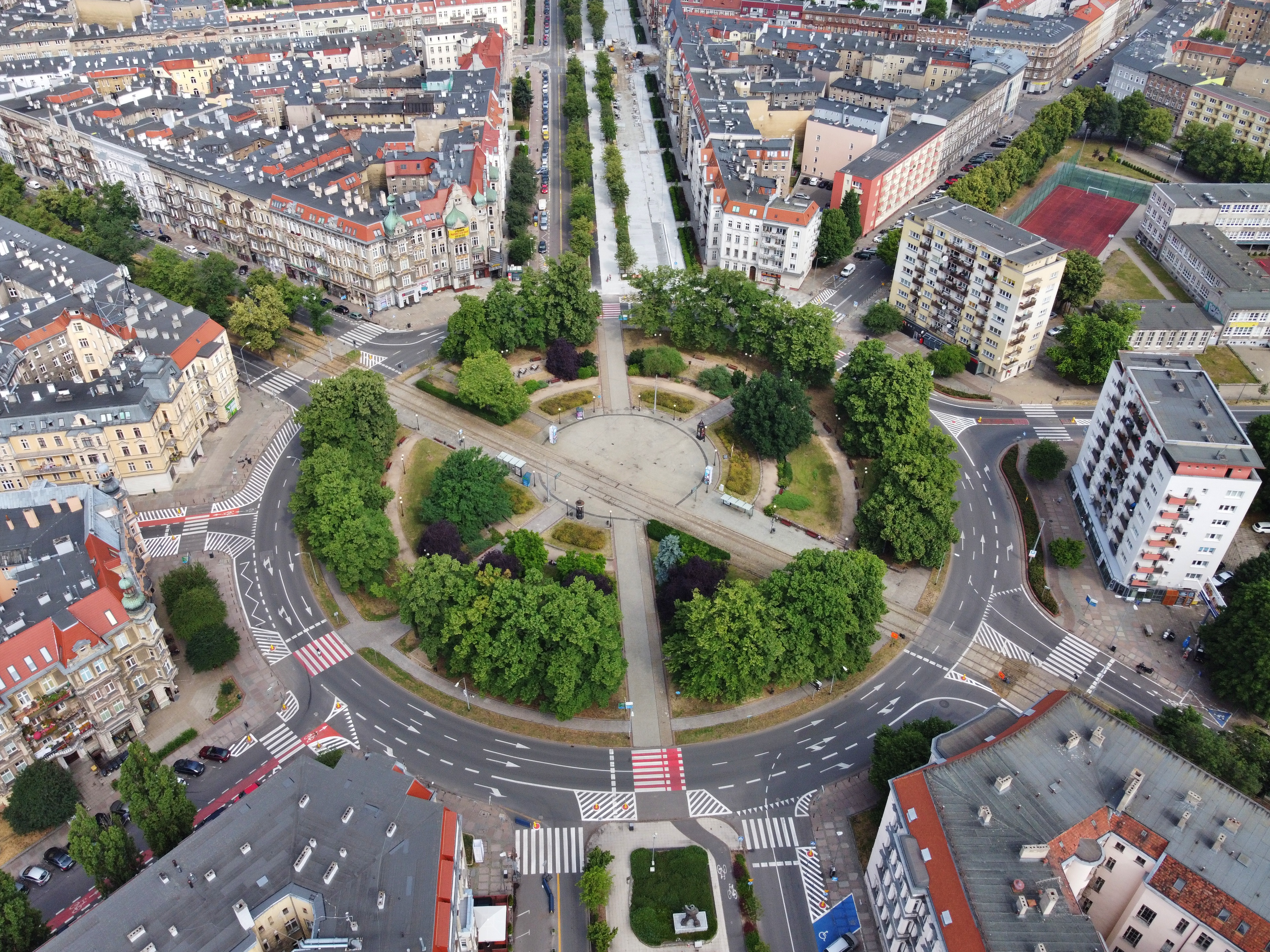
- From top right to bottom left: Ducal Castle, Hanza Tower, Bright Meadows, and Grunwald Square

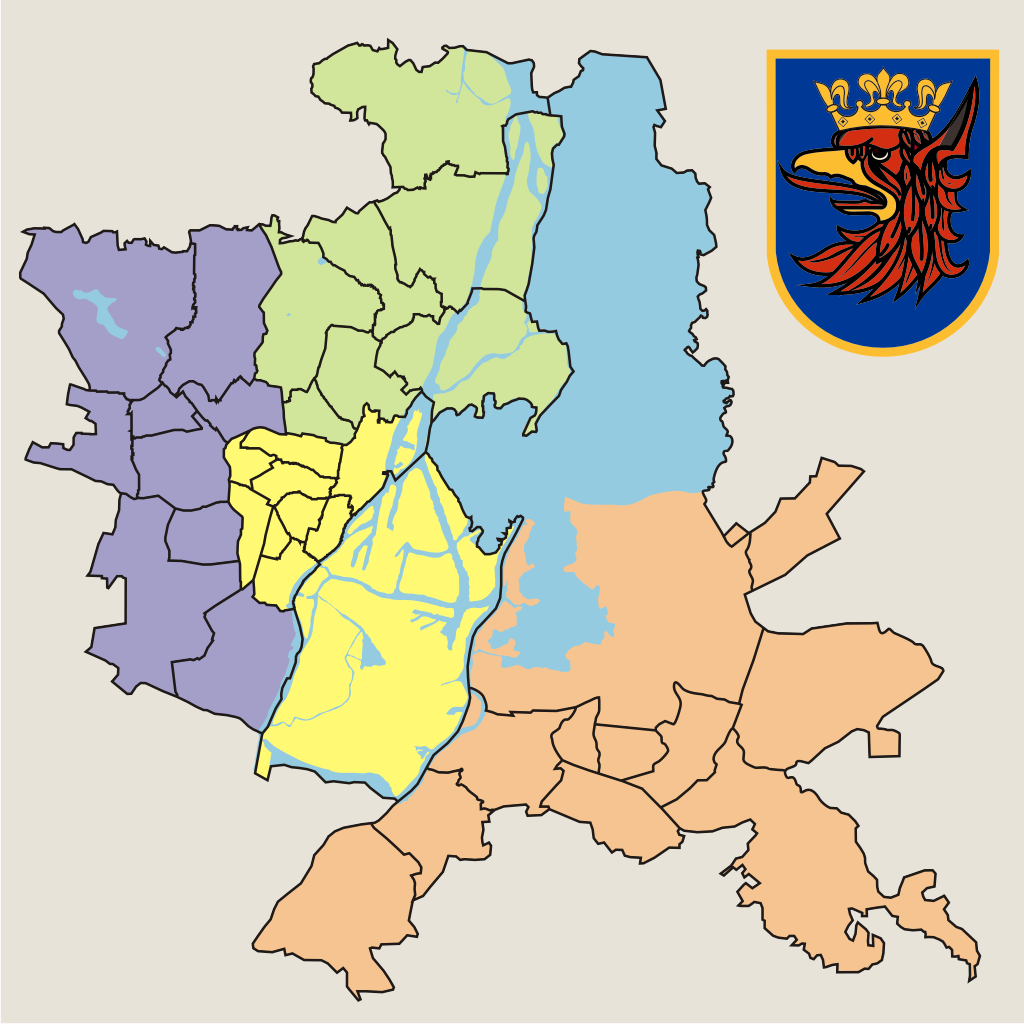
- Śródmieście among other districts of Szczecin.
- Coordinates: 53°24′48″N 14°34′38″E
- Country: Poland
- Voivodeship: West Pomeranian
- City county: Szczecin
- Established: 1990

Area
  - Total: 45.9 km^{2} (17.7 sq mi)

Population (2022)
  - Total: 104 294
  - Density: 2.27/km^{2} (5.87/sq mi)
- Time zone: UTC+1 (CET)
  - Summer (DST): UTC+2 (CEST)
- Area code: +48 91
- Car plates: ZS

Śródmieście (Note: Polish pronunciation: [ɕrudˈmʲɛɕt͡ɕɛ]; translation from Polish: city centre, downtown; German: Stadtmitte) is one of four districts of the city of Szczecin, Poland, situated in central part of the city. In 2022, it had a population of 104,294 people, and an area of 45.9 km² (17.7 square miles).

== History ==
The city had been originally divided into four districts in 1955. Said subdivisions were: Dąbie, Nad Odrą, Pogodno, and Śródmieście. The district of Śródmieście was located in the south-central portion of the city, roughly corresponding with its location to the modern district of Śródmieście, though with different boundaries. The four districts were abolished in 1976. The city was again divided into four districts in 1990, with one of the established subdivisions being Śródmieście.

== Subdivisions ==
Śródmieście is divided into 10 municipal neighbourhoods.

Name	Population (2022)	Image	Map
Centrum (Centre)	15 392		
Drzetowo-Grabowo	14 389		
Łękno	2947		
Międzyodrze-Wyspa Pucka (Międzyodrze-Pucka Island)	779		
Niebuszewo-Bolinko	19 016		
Nowe Miasto (New Town)	8583		
Stare Miasto (Old Town)	3804		
Śródmieście-Północ (Downtown-North)	11 043		
Śródmieście-Zachód (Downtown-South)	12 114		
Turzyn	16 227		
