= Załom-Kasztanowe =

Neighbourhood of Szczecin, Poland

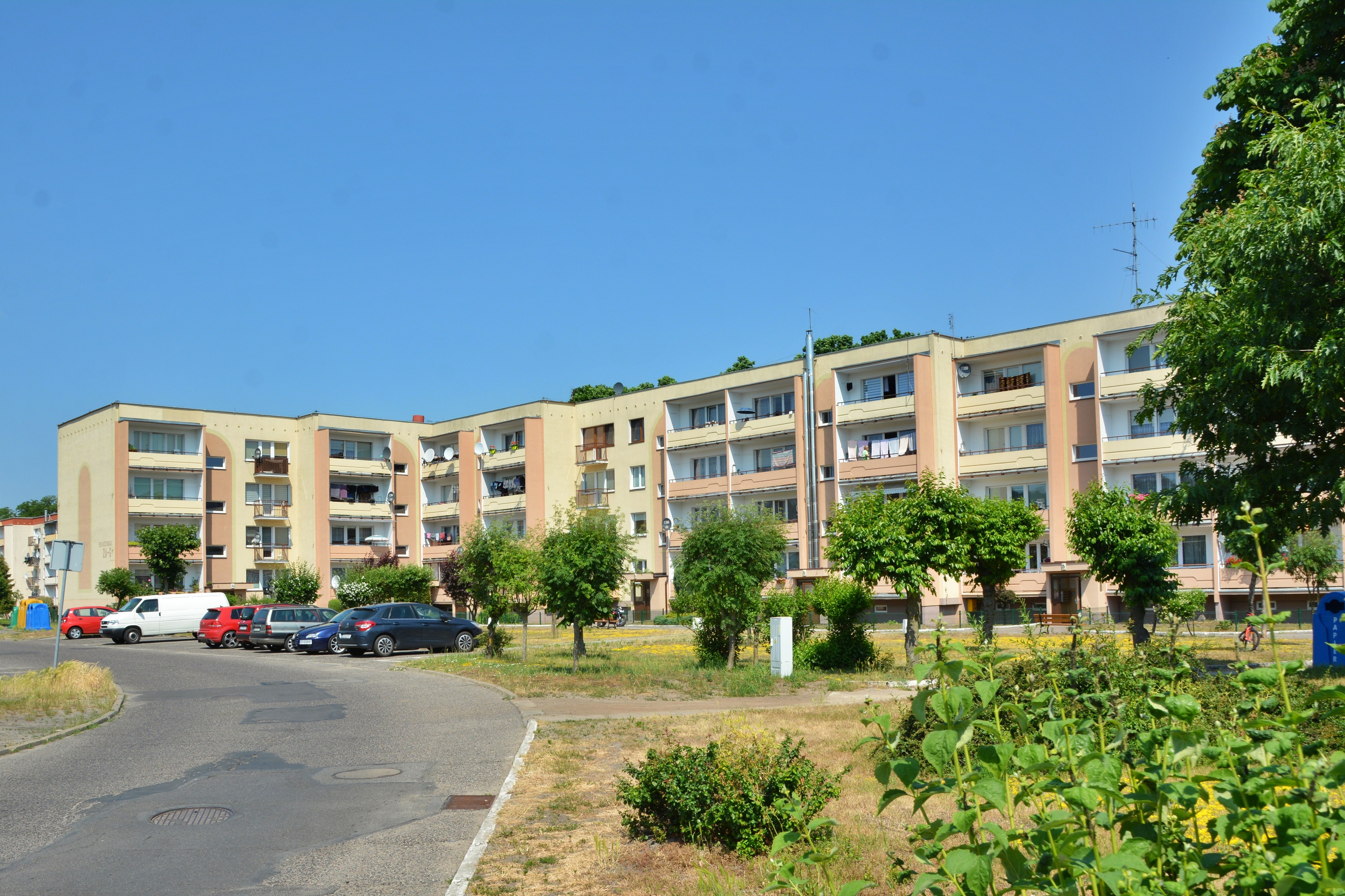

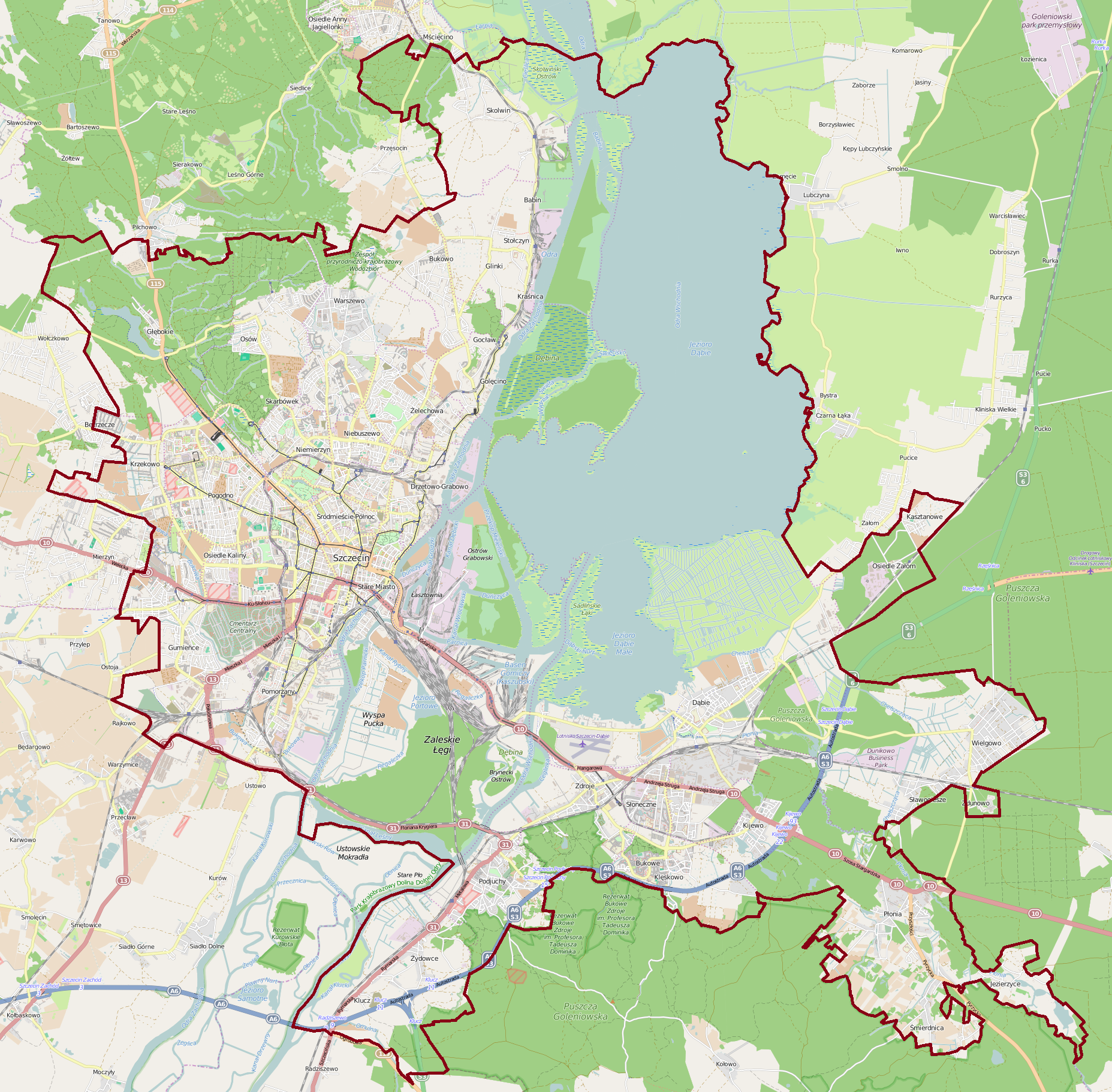
- Location within Szczecin Location within Poland
- Coordinates: 53.4289°N 14.7354°E
- Country: Poland
- Voivodeship: West Pomeranian
- County/City: Szczecin
- Within city limits: 1964
- Time zone: UTC+1 (CET)
  - Summer (DST): UTC+2 (CEST)
- Vehicle registration: ZS

Załom-Kasztanowe (until 2012: Załom, formerly German Arnimswalde) is a municipal neighborhood of the city of Szczecin, Poland situated on the right bank of Oder river, east of the Szczecin Old Town, and Szczecin-Dąbie.

The area became part of the emerging Duchy of Poland under its first ruler Mieszko I around 967, and following Poland's fragmentation in 1138, it formed part of the Duchy of Pomerania. During the Thirty Years' War, the settlement was ruled by the Swedish Empire. From 1871, it was part of Germany until the defeat of Nazi Germany in World War II in 1945 when the area was reintegrated back into Poland.
