= Zachód, Szczecin =

Coordinates: 53.4399°N 14.4972°E

Zachód
- District
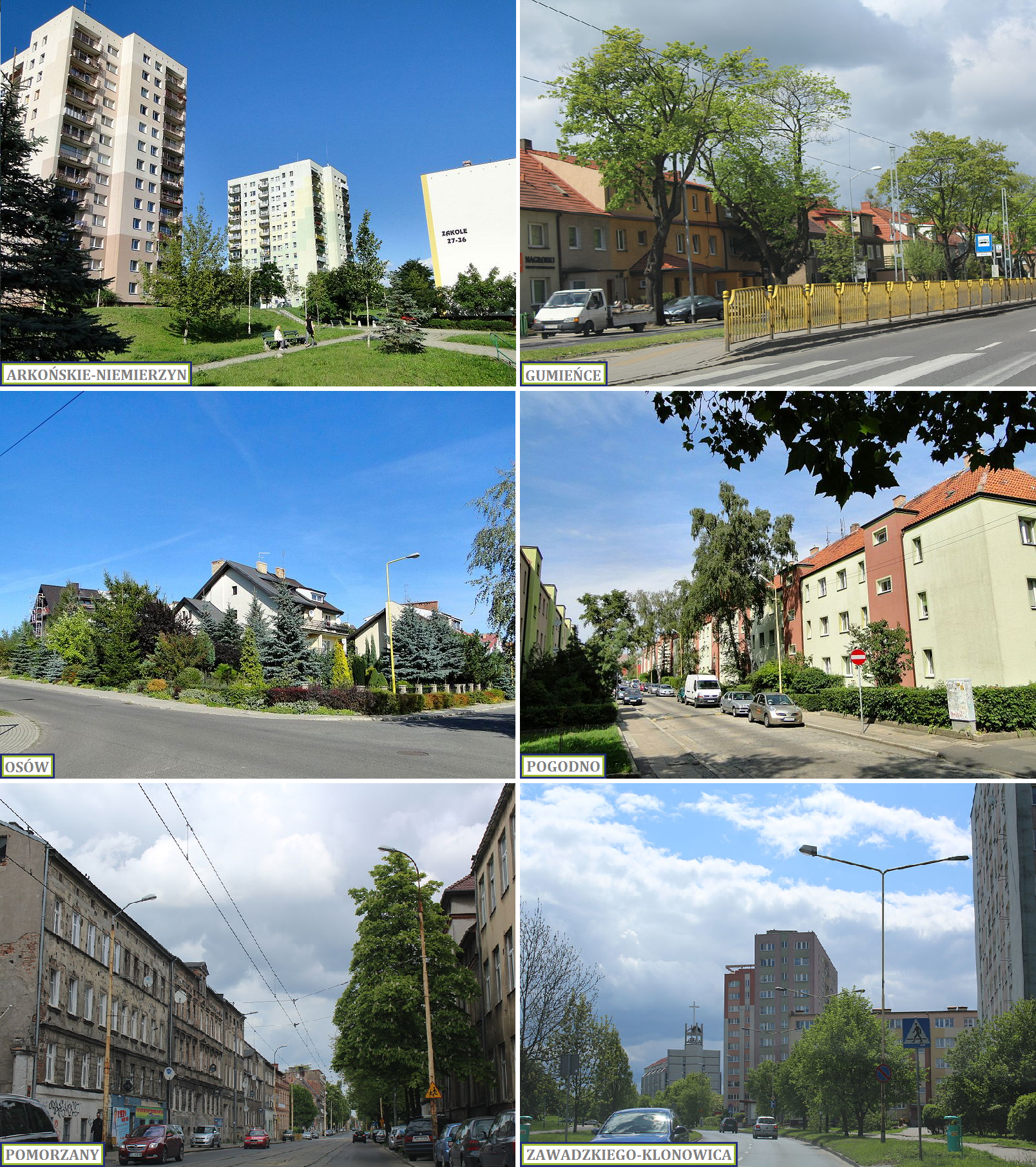
- Interactive map of Zachód
- Country: Poland
- Voivodeship: West Pomeranian
- County/City: Szczecin

Population (2011)
  - Total: 116,232
- Time zone: UTC+1 (CET)
  - Summer (DST): UTC+2 (CEST)
- Area code: +48 91
- Car plates: ZS

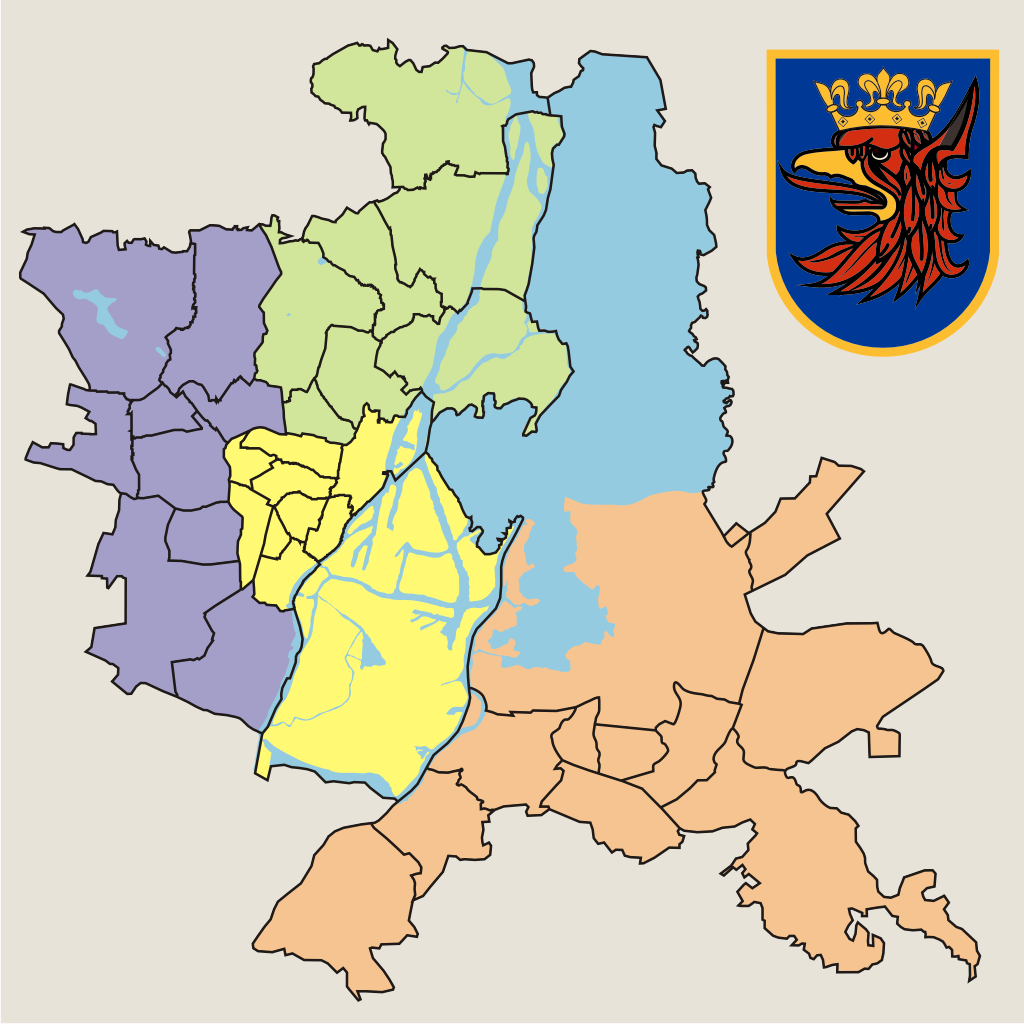
Districts of Szczecin: Śródmieście Zachód Północ Prawobrzeże

Zachód (lit. West) is one of four districts (Polish: dzielnica) of Szczecin, Poland situated on the left bank of Oder river in western part of the city. As of January 2011 it had a population of 116,232.

Zachód is divided into 9 municipal neighbourhoods:

- Arkońskie-Niemierzyn
- Głębokie-Pilchowo
- Gumieńce
- Krzekowo-Bezrzecze
- Osów
- Pogodno
- Pomorzany
- Świerczewo
- Zawadzkiego-Klonowica
