= Gunice =

- Settlement
- Location within Poland
- Coordinates: 53°32′54″N 14°26′57″E
- Country: Poland
- Voivodeship: West Pomeranian
- County: Police
- Gmina: Police

Gunice [ɡuˈnit͡sɛ] (German: Günnitz) is a settlement in the administrative district of Gmina Police, within Police County, West Pomeranian Voivodeship, in north-western Poland, close to the German border. It lies approximately 8 km (5 mi) west of Police and 18 km (11 mi) north-west of the regional capital Szczecin.

For the history of the region, see History of Pomerania.
