= Zdroje, Szczecin =

Neighbourhood of Szczecin, Poland

Zdroje
- Municipal neighbourhood of Szczecin
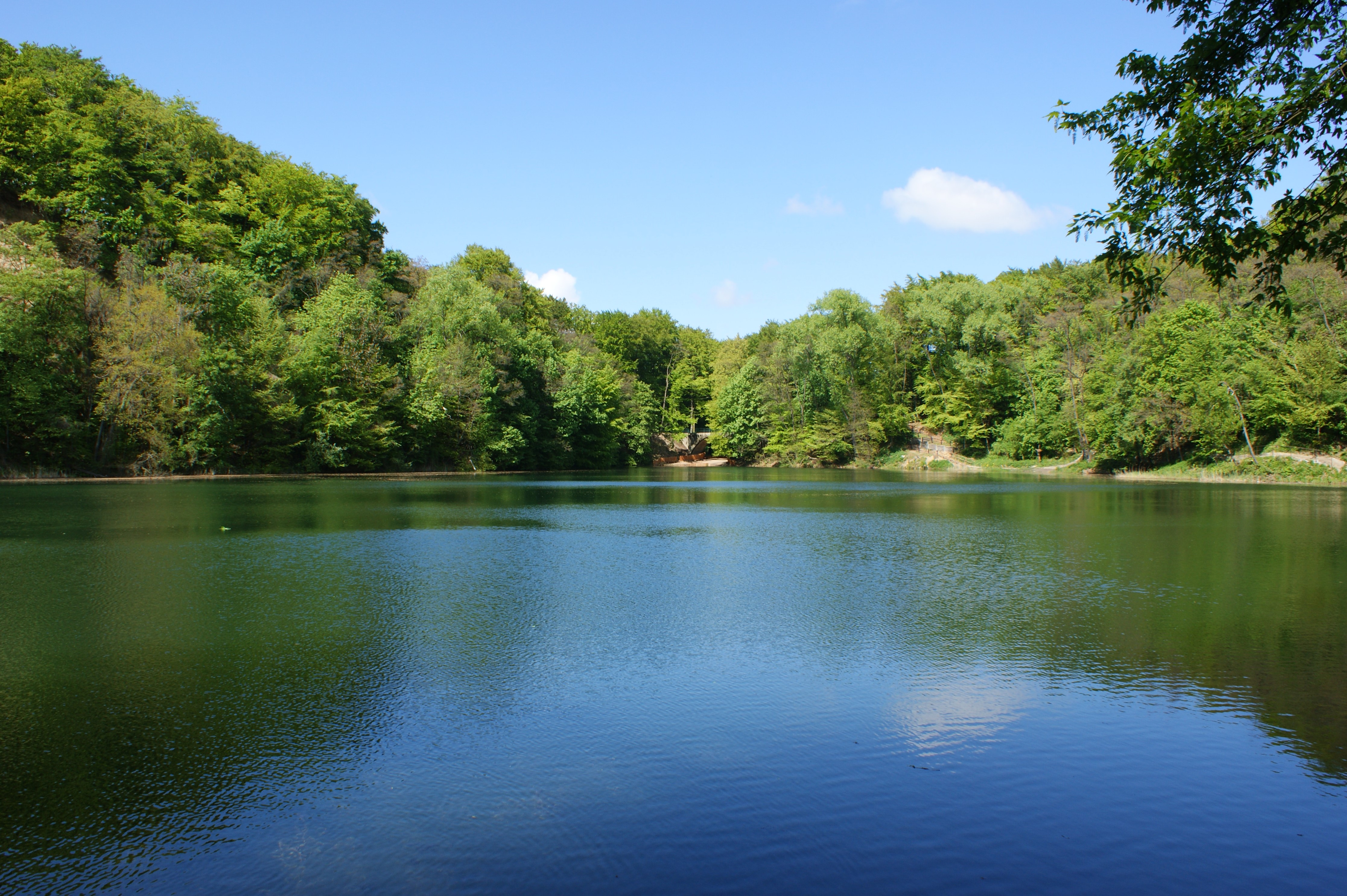
- Szmaragdowe Lake in Zdroje, Szczecin

- Location of Zdroje within Szczecin
- Coordinates: 53°23′N 14°38′E
- Country: Poland
- Voivodeship: West Pomeranian
- County/City: Szczecin
- Within city limits: 1939-1945, again since 1948

Area
  - Total: 6.4 km^{2} (2.5 sq mi)

Population (2016)
  - Total: 8,600
  - Density: 1,300/km^{2} (3,500/sq mi)
- Time zone: UTC+1 (CET)
  - Summer (DST): UTC+2 (CEST)
- Vehicle registration: ZS
- Climate: Cfb
- Primary airport: Solidarity Szczecin–Goleniów Airport

Zdroje (German: Finkenwalde) is a municipal neighborhood of the city of Szczecin, Poland situated on the right bank of the river East Oder, south-east of the Szczecin Old Town, and south-west of Dąbie, Szczecin.

Within Nazi Germany, the suburb was the site of Dietrich Bonhoeffer's illegal (after 1937) Theological Seminary of the Confessing Church between 1935 and 1937, and during World War II, the German Nazi government operated a forced labour subcamp of the prison in Goleniów in the district.
