= Dzielnica =

Administrative subdivision in Poland

In the Polish system of local administration, a dzielnica (Polish pronunciation: [d͡ʑɛlˈɲit͡sa]; plural dzielnice) is an administrative subdivision or quarter of a city or town. A dzielnica may have its own elected council (rada dzielnicy, or dzielnica council), and those of Warsaw each have their own mayor (burmistrz). Like the osiedle and sołectwo, a dzielnica is an auxiliary unit (jednostka pomocnicza) of a gmina. These units are created by decision of the gmina council, and do not have legal personality in their own right.

The subsidiary units of many towns and cities are called osiedles rather than dzielnice, although it is also possible for osiedles to exist within a dzielnica. Numbers and sizes of dzielnice vary significantly between cities. Warsaw has 18 dzielnice, as does Kraków; Gdańsk has 34, Gdynia 22, Lublin 27, Katowice 22 and Szczecin 4. Some cities are no longer formally divided into dzielnice, although formerly existing dzielnice continue to be referred to as such and serve as areas of jurisdiction for administrative offices. Łódź, Wrocław and Poznań are each divided into five districts of this type.

The word dzielnica is also used informally in Polish to refer to any distinct part of a town or city. Historically it can also refer to a region of the country, in particular any of the five principalities into which Poland was divided following the death of Bolesław III Wrymouth in 1138; see Testament of Bolesław III Wrymouth.
