= Śródmieście-Zachód =

Neighbourhood of Szczecin, Poland

- Administrative neighbourhood
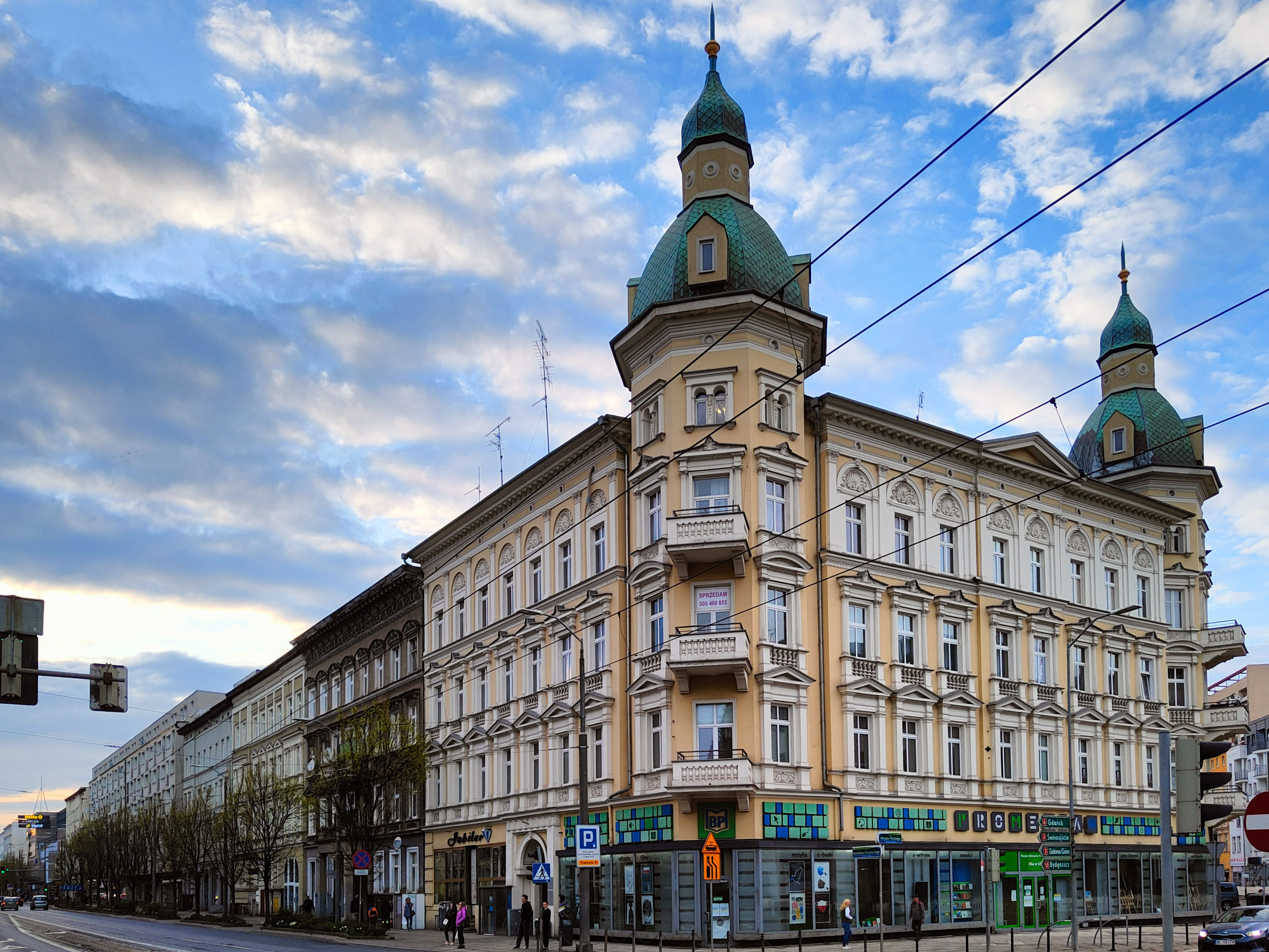
- Bolesława Krzywoustego Street in Śródmieście-Zachód.

- Location within Szczecin

- Map of Śródmieście-Zachód
- Coordinates: 53°25′38.3″N 14°32′25.8″E
- Country: Poland
- Voivodeship: West Pomeranian
- City and county: Szczecin
- District: Downtown
- Seat: 22 Władysława Łokietka Street

Area
  - Total: 0.53 km^{2} (0.20 sq mi)

Population (2025)
  - Total: 11,403
  - Density: 22,000/km^{2} (56,000/sq mi)
- Time zone: UTC+1 (CET)
  - Summer (DST): UTC+2 (CEST)
- Area code: +48 91
- Car plates: ZS

Śródmieście-Zachód (Polish: [ɕrudˈmjɛɕ.t͡ɕɛ ˈza.xut]; lit. 'Downtown-West') is an administrative neighbourhood forming a subdivision of the Downtown district in the city of Szczecin, Poland. It is a mid-rise residential area dominated by tenement houses. The neighbourhood has an area of 0.53 km^{2}, making it the smallest by size in the city. In 2025, it was inhabited by 11,403 people. The area was developed in the 19th century, with construction of tenement houses. It includes Pionier 1907, one of the oldest continuously operated cinemas in the world, dating to 1909, and a portion of a campus of the West Pomeranian University of Technology.

== History ==
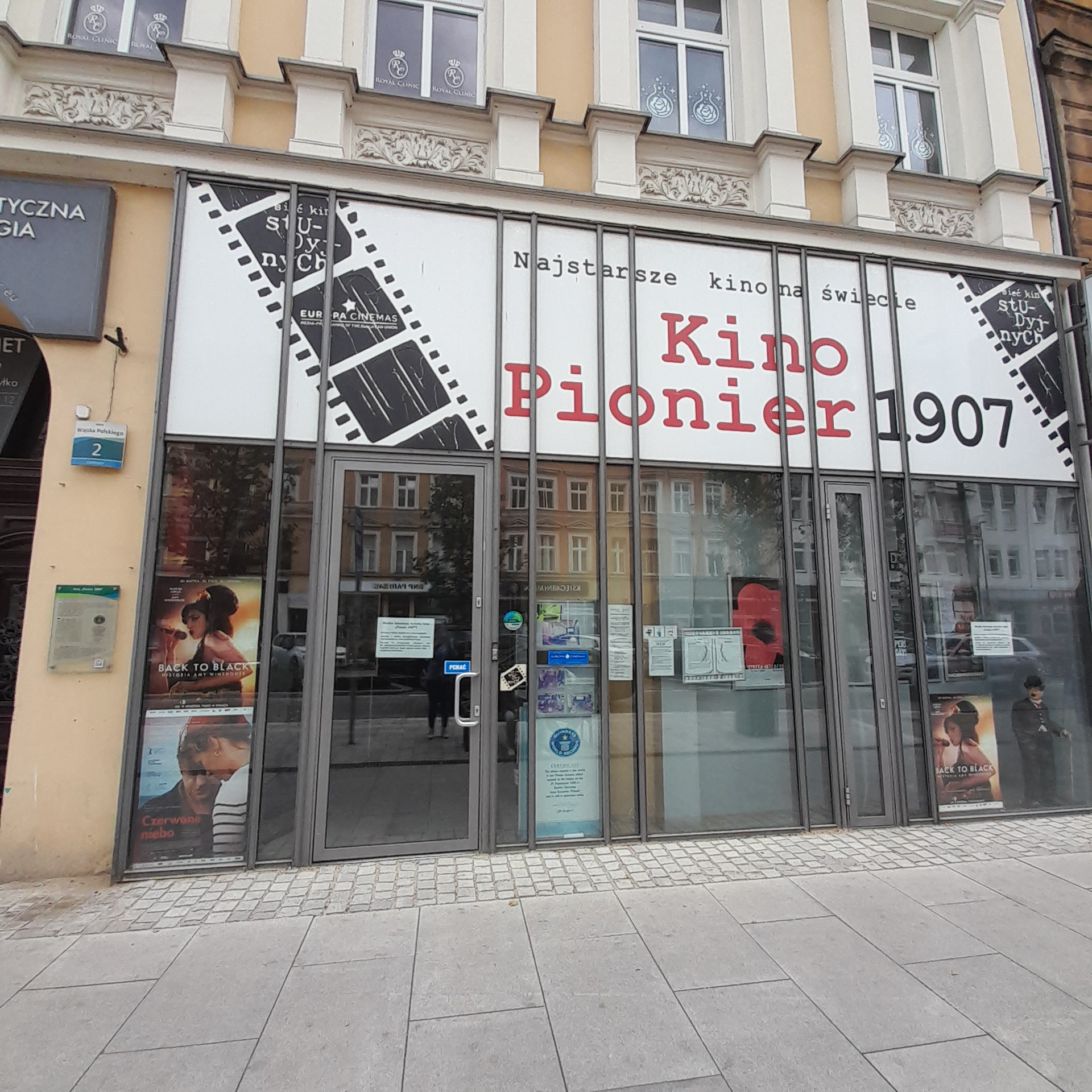
The Pionier 1907, opened in 1909, one of the oldest continuously-operated cinemas in the world.

In the second half of the 19th century, tenement houses were developed in the area between current Piastów Avenue, Polish Armed Forces Avenue, Kopernika Street, and Narutowicza Street, forming a downtown residential area.

In the 1880s, the Concord and Grey Ranks Squares, originally known as the Bismarck, and Arndt Square, respectively, were developed alongside the current Polish Army Avenue. Additionally, the Tadeusz Kościuszko Square and Janina Szczerska Square, then jointly known as the Schinkel Square, were formed at the intersection of the current Piastów Avenue and Bolesława Krzywoustego Street.

In 1909, the ciname Pionier 1907, known until 1945, as Helios, and the World Theatre, was opened at the current 2 Polish Army Avenue. Prior to its official opening, the location hosted film screening as early as 1907. It is recognized as one of the oldest continuously operating cinemas in the world, and from 2005 to 2008, it was listed in the Guinness World Records.

A portion of the neighbourhood's tenements were destroyed during the Second World War, and replaced after the conflict with socialist realist apartment buildings.

In 1946, the Szczecin University of Technology was founded in the nearby neighbourhood of Turzyn, at 37 Sikorskiego Street. In 1947, its Faculty of Civil Engineering and Architecture was founded at Piastów Avenue, within the current boundaries of Śródmieście-Zachód at 50 Piastów Avenue. In 2020, it was split into the Faculty of Architecture, and the Faculty of Civil and Environmental Engineering, with the latter remaining in the building.

In 1959, Kosmos Cinema was opened at 8 Polish Army Avenue, being houses in a modernist building, with a façade decorated with a mosaic by Sławomir Lewiński and Emanuel Messer. At the time, the cinema was considered the most technologically advanced in the Central and Eastern Europe. It operated until 2003. The building was sold in 2013, and retrofitted into a dance club and concert venue.

From 1955 to 1976, the area of the current Śródmieście-Zachód was part of the neighbourhood of Śródmieście (lit. 'Downtown'), which formed one of the administrative subdivisions of the eponymous city district. On 28 November 1990, the neighbourhood of Śródmieście-Zachód was established as one of the administrative subdivisions of the Downtown district.

In 2003, the shopping mall Kupiec was opened at 9 and 10 Bolesława Krzywoustego Street. In 2013, the Nanotechnology Research and Education Centre of the West Pomeranian University of Technology was opened at 45 Piastów Avenue.

== Characteristics ==
Śródmieście-Zachód is a mid-rise residential area with tenements and apartment buildings. It includes two circular urban squares, the Concord and Grey Ranks, placed alongside Polish Armed Forces Avenue, as well as the Tadeusz Kościuszko Square and Janina Szczerska Square, at the intersection of Polish Armed Forces Avenue, Piastów Avenue, and Bolesława Krzywoustego Street. The southwestern portion of the neighbourhood features a portion of the campus of the West Pomeranian University of Technology, including the Nanotechnology Research and Education Centre, and the Faculty of Civil and Environmental Engineering, located at 45, and 50A Piastów Avenue, respectively.

Śródmieście-Zachód also includes the cinema Pionier 1907, which features two screening rooms. Opened in 1909, it is one of the oldest continuously operated cinemas, and from 2005 to 2008, it was listed as the oldest in the Guinness World Records. Kosmos Cinema, a modernist building from 1959, is also in the neighborhood, originally serving as a cinema, and currently, since 2013, being used as a dance club and a concert venue. Its façade features a decorative mosaic by Sławomir Lewiński and Emanuel Messer. Śródmieście-Zachód also has the shopping mall Kupiec, with a store area of 9,877 m^{2}, and a multiplex, located at 9 and 10 Bolesława Krzywoustego Street.

== Government ==
Śródmieście-Zachód is one of the municipal neighbourhoods of Szczecin, governed by a locally elected council with 15 members. Its headquarters are located at 22 Władysława Łokietka Street.

== Boundaries ==
The boundaries of Śródmieście-Zachód are approximately determined by Polish Army Avenue, Kopernika Street, Child Square, Narutowicza Street, and Piastów Avenue. It borders Śródmieście-Północ, Centrum, New Town, and Turzyn. It has a total area of 0.53 km^{2}.
