= Mikhail Dolivo-Dobrovolsky Bench =

Monument in Szczecin, Poland

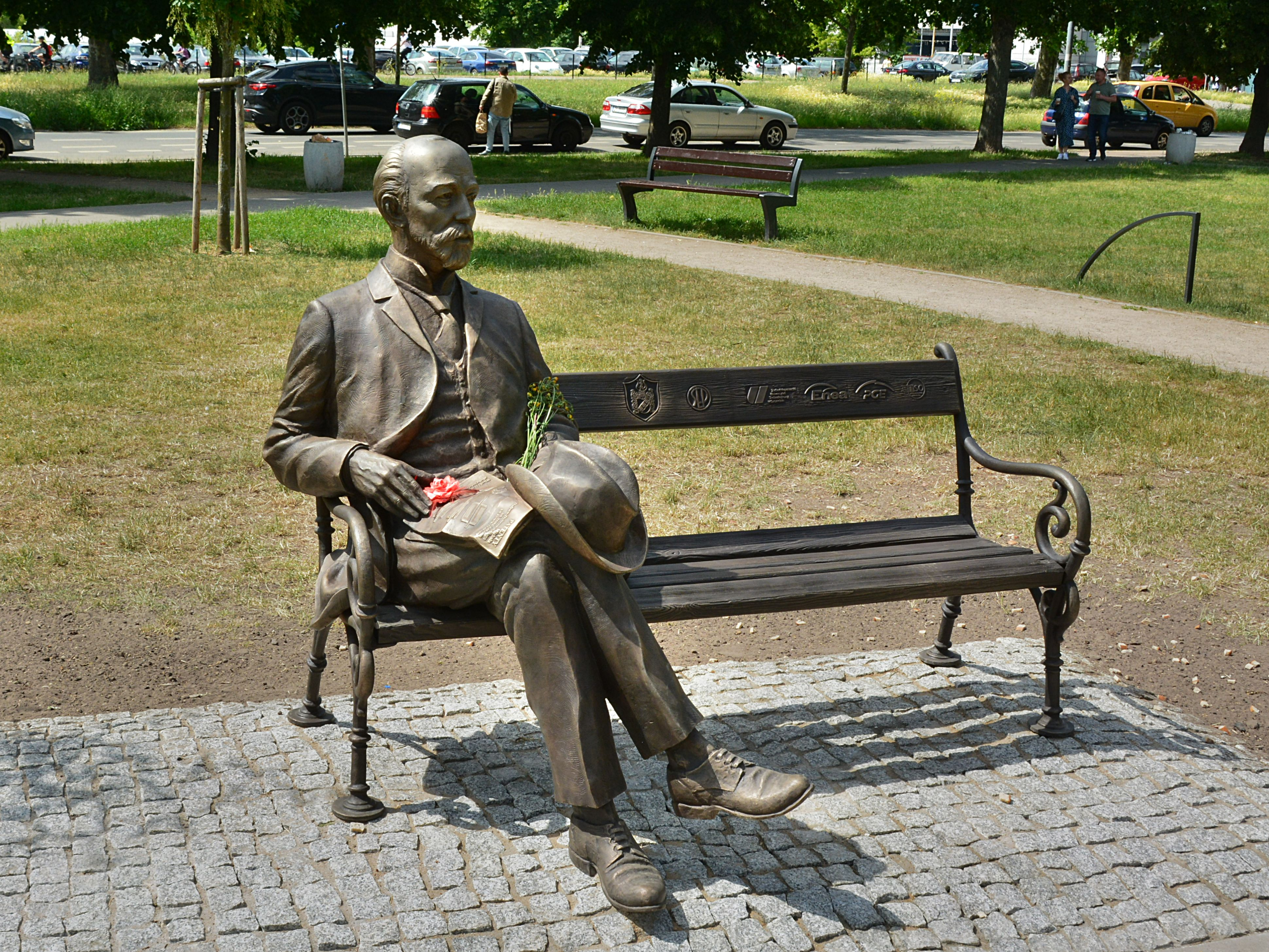
- The monument in 2022.
- Interactive map of Mikhail Dolivo-Dobrovolsky Bench
- Location: Mikhail Dolivo-Dobrovolsky Square, Turzyn, Szczecin, Poland
- Coordinates: 53°25′28.35″N 14°31′55.49″E
- Designer: Marian Molenda
- Type: Statue, bench monument
- Material: Bronze
- Opening date: 10 June 2022
- Dedicated to: Mikhail Dolivo-Dobrovolsky

The Mikhail Dolivo-Dobrovolsky Bench (Russian pronunciation: [mʲɪxɐˈiɫ dɐˈlʲivə dəbrɐˈvolʲskʲɪj]; Polish: Ławeczka Michała Doliwo-Dobrowolskiego) is a monument in Szczecin, Poland, located within the neighbourhood of Turzyn in the Downtown district. It is placed at the Mikhail Dolivo-Dobrovolsky Square, at the corner of Sikorskiego Street and Bohaterów Warszawy Avenu after him. It is dedicate to Mikhail Dolivo-Dobrovolsky (1862–1919), a 19th- and 20th-century engineer, electrician, and inventor. Monument consists of his life-sized bronze statue, placed on a bench. It was designed by Marian Molenda, and unveiled on 10 June 2022.

== History ==
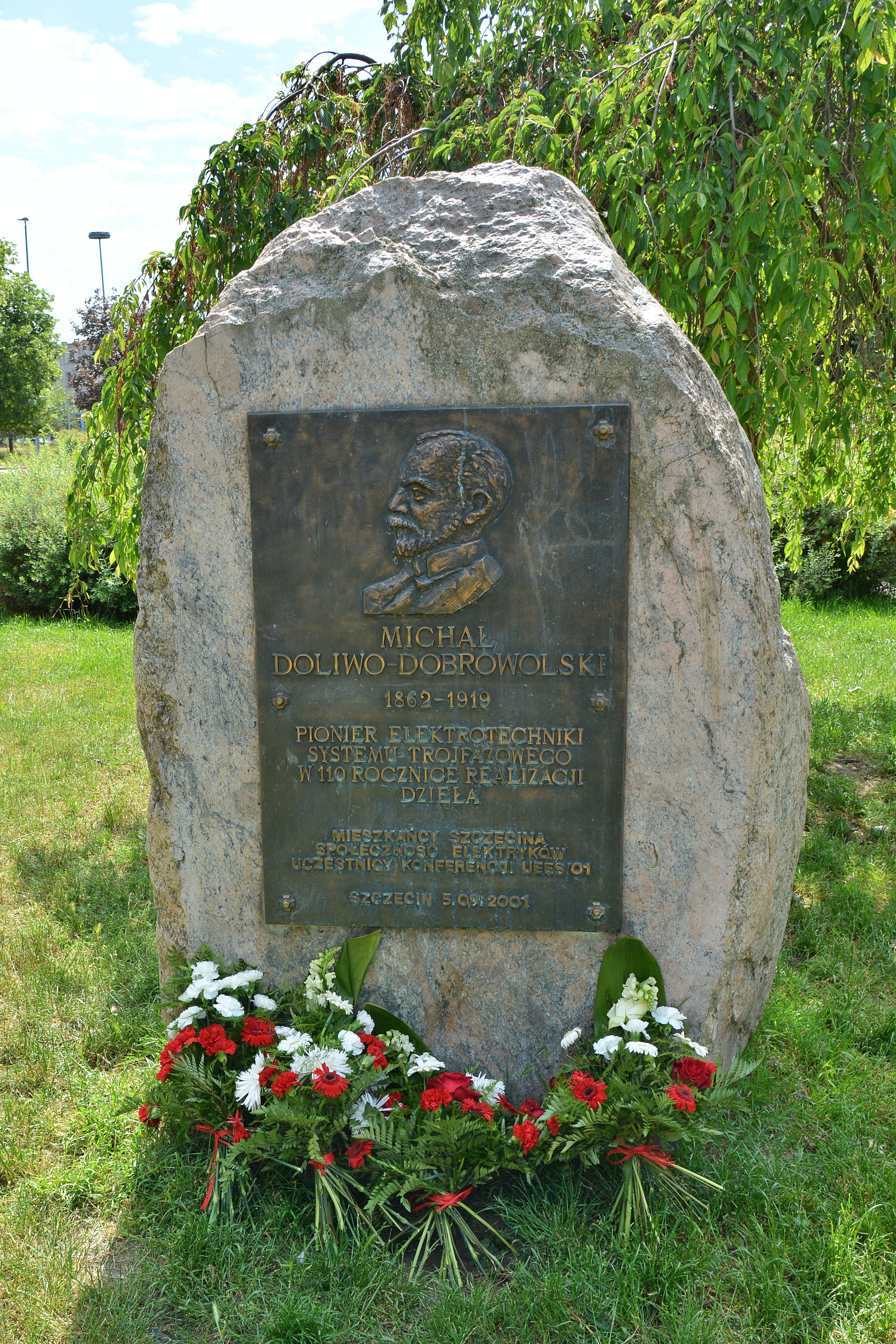
A commemorative plaque unveiled at the Mikhail Dolivo-Dobrovolsky Square in 2001, prior to the creation of the statue.

The monument is dedicated to Mikhail Dolivo-Dobrovolsky (1862–1919), a 19th- and 20th-century engineer, electrician, and inventor. On 15 September 1999, the society of electricians in Szczecin filed a petition to the city council to commemorate Dolivo-Dobrovolsky in the city. On 29 May 2001, the council named a garden square located at the corner of Sikorskiego Street and Bohaterów Warszawy Avenu after him. The square is also located near the building of the Faculty of Electrical Engineering of the West Pomeranian University of Technology. On 5 September 2001, a commemorative pink rock was unveiled at the square, baring a plaque designed by Bohdan Ronin-Walknowski. It was placed at the square in connection to the UEES International Convention hosted at the Faculty of Electrical Engineering of the West Pomeranian University of Technology.

In 2022, the Association of Polish Electricians, together with the Polish Section of the Institute of Electrical and Electronics Engineers, asked the city council for permission to erects a statue of Dolivo-Dobrovolsky at the square. The council approved it on 24 May 2022. It was designed by Marian Molenda, who based it on three photographs of Dolivo-Dobrovolsky. The monument was cast in bronze in Opole by the company Art Odlew, and installed by the company Enso based in Szczecin. The monument cost 160,000 Polish zloties, which was covered by the Association of Polish Electricians, and the donations from the public and a few companies and institutions. It was unveiled at the square on 10 June 2022, on the International Electrician Day. The year also marked the 160th anniversary of the birth of Dolivo-Dobrovolsky in 1862.

== Characteristics ==
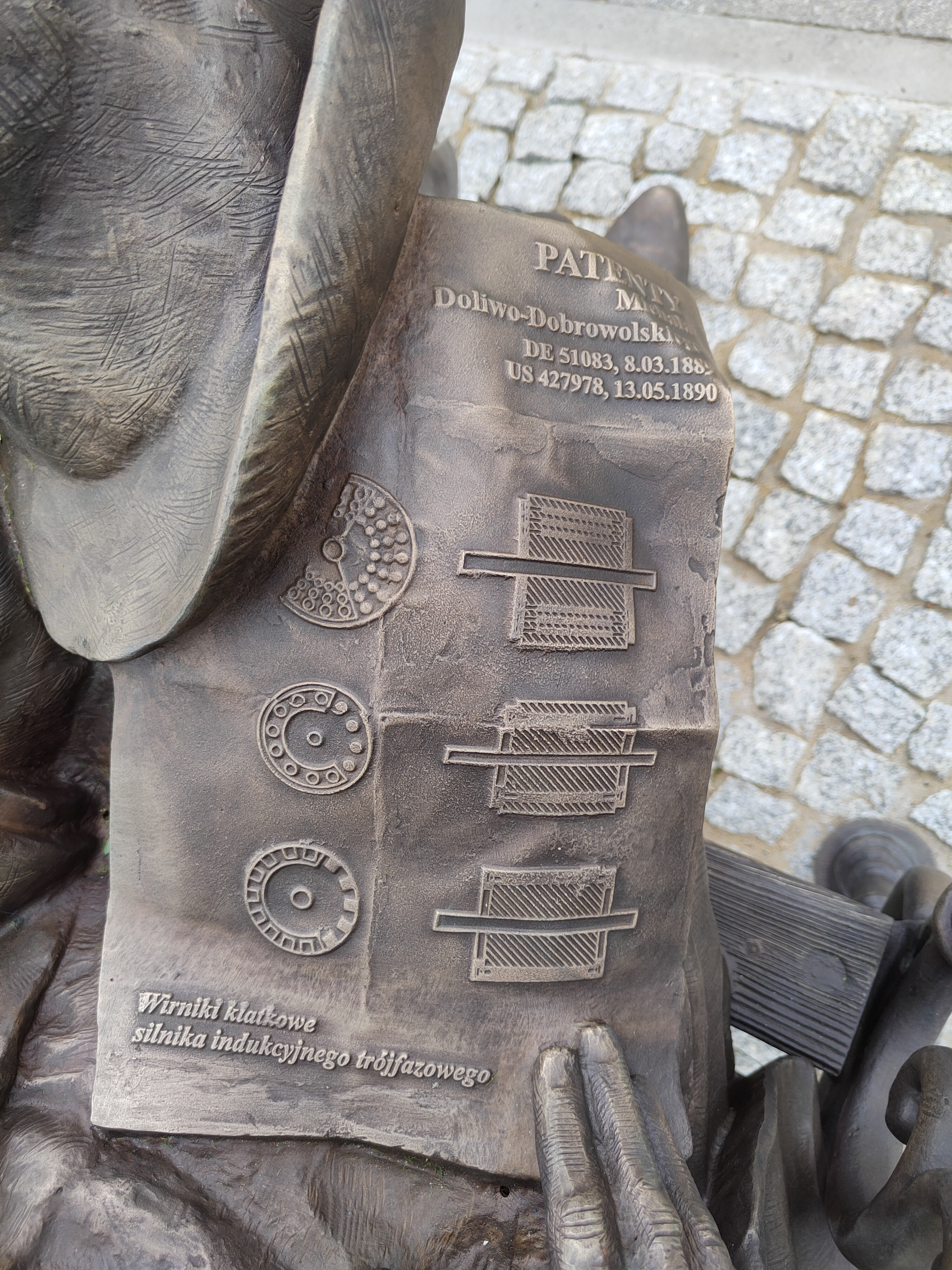
The schematics of Dolivo-Dobrovolsky's mechanical design, forming part of the monument.

The monument consists of a life-sized bronze statue of Mikhail Dolivo-Dobrovolsky placed on a bench. It is located at the Mikhail Dolivo-Dobrovolsky Square (Polish: Skwer im. Michała Doliwo-Dobrowolskiego), at the corner of Sikorskiego Street and Bohaterów Warszawy Avenu after him. The statue is placed on the left side of the bench, with the backrest featuring logos of the institutions and companies which sponsored its construction. Dolivo-Dobrovolsky is depicted in a sitting position, with crossed legs, with the right one on top, and looking towards the building of the Faculty of Faculty of Electrical Engineering of the West Pomeranian University of Technology. He is a suit, and holds a cowboy hat in his left right hand, rested on his knees. He is depicted as at the age of the highlight of his career. In his right hand, he holds a piece of paper, depicting the schematic of his design of a squirrel-cage rotor of three-phase induction motor. It also bears the following inscription on it:

Polish inscription

Patenty Michała Doliwo-Dobrowolskiego
DE 51083, 8.03.1889
US 427978, 13.05.1890
Wirniki klatkowe silnika indykcyjnego trojfazowego

Translation:
English translation

The Mikhail Dolivo-Dobrovolsky's patents
Germany, no. 51083, 8 March 1889
United States, no. 427978, 11 May 1890
The squirrel-cage rotors of three-phase induction motor

The square also includes a pink rock with a commemorative plaque dedicated to Dolivo-Dobrovolsky.
