= Torney (disambiguation) =

Torney may refer to the following places:

- Torney, a surname of English, Irish, and German origin
- Torney General Hospital, a hospital in Palm Springs, California, United States
- Torney, a former name for Turzyn, a neighbourhood in Szczecin, Poland
