= Torney =

Torney is an English, Northern-Irish and German surname which is most prevalent in Australia and has its highest density in the North of Ireland.

As a habitational surname it may be connected to French locations with the name Tournay or Tournai (from Proto-Celtic turno- "height" with the Gaulish toponymic suffix -acu(m), meaning "location of the hills" or "shore heights") – and carried by people arriving after the Norman conquest in 1066 – or to a variety of British places named Thorney (with the Old English meaning of "thorn tree island"). As an Irish name it is the reduced Anglicized form of Ó Torna (meaning "descendant of Torna", a personal name). In Slavic influenced eastern Germany it is a toponymic surname – derived similarly as in England from the word thorn – and probably referred to a location characterized by thorn bushes and/or trees.

Notable people with the name Torney include:

- George H. Torney (1850–1913), physician in the United States Navy and Army
- Henry Torney (1884–1942), American football player and industrial engineer
- Hugh Torney (Irish republican) (1954–1996), Irish National Liberation Army (INLA) paramilitary leader
- Hugh Torney (footballer) (1909–2000), Australian rules footballer
- Jason Torney (born 1977), retired Australian rules footballer
- Kate Torney (born 19??), Australian journalist
- Thomas Torney (1915–1998), British Labour Party politician
- Viktor von Strauß und Torney (1809–1899), German princely minister and poet
