= Outbuilding of the Snail Gate Barracks =

Historical building in Szczecin, Poland

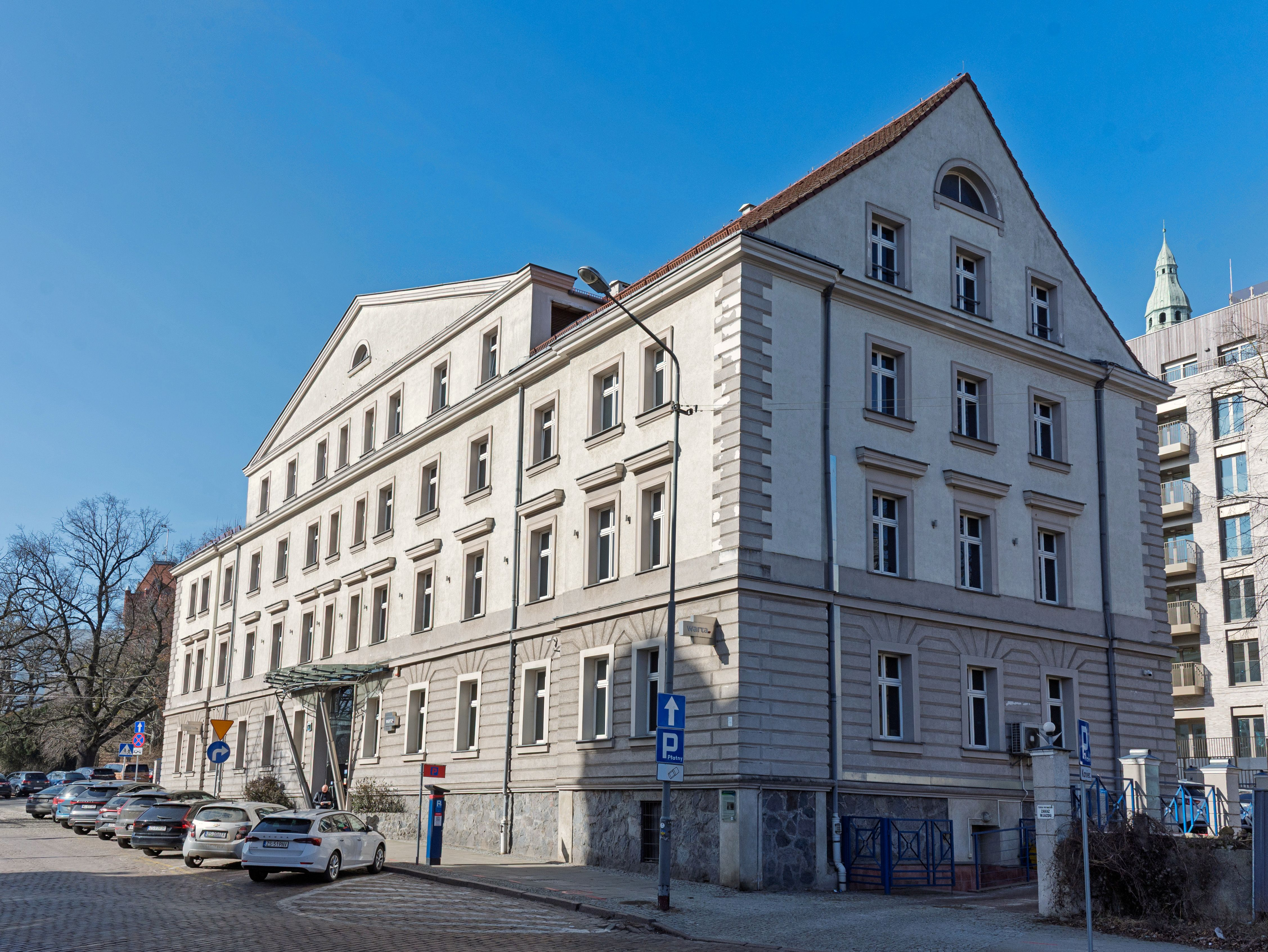
- The building in 2026.
- Interactive map of the Outbuilding of the Snail Gate Barracks area

General information
- Type: Outbuilding, office building
- Architectural style: Neoclassical
- Location: 1A Dworcowa Street, New Town, Szczecin, Poland
- Coordinates: 53°25′18.84″N 14°33′16.92″E
- Completed: 1818

Design and construction
- Developer: Royal Prussian Army

The outbuilding of the Snail Gate Barracks (Polish: budynek gospodarczy Koszar Bramy Ślimaczej; German: Ökonomiegebäude des Schneckentor-Kasernement), also simply referred to as the Snail Gate Barracks (Polish: Koszary Bramy Ślimaczej; German: Schneckentor-Kasernement), is a historical neoclassical residential building in Szczecin, Poland, located at 1A Dworcowa Street, within the neighbourhood of New Town in the Downtown district. It was developed in 1818, as an outbuilding to barracks of the Royal Prussian Army on Podchale Street, which were later demolished at the beginning of the 19th century. Currently, it is used as an office building, housing the Szczecin branch of the insurance company TUiR Warta.

== History ==
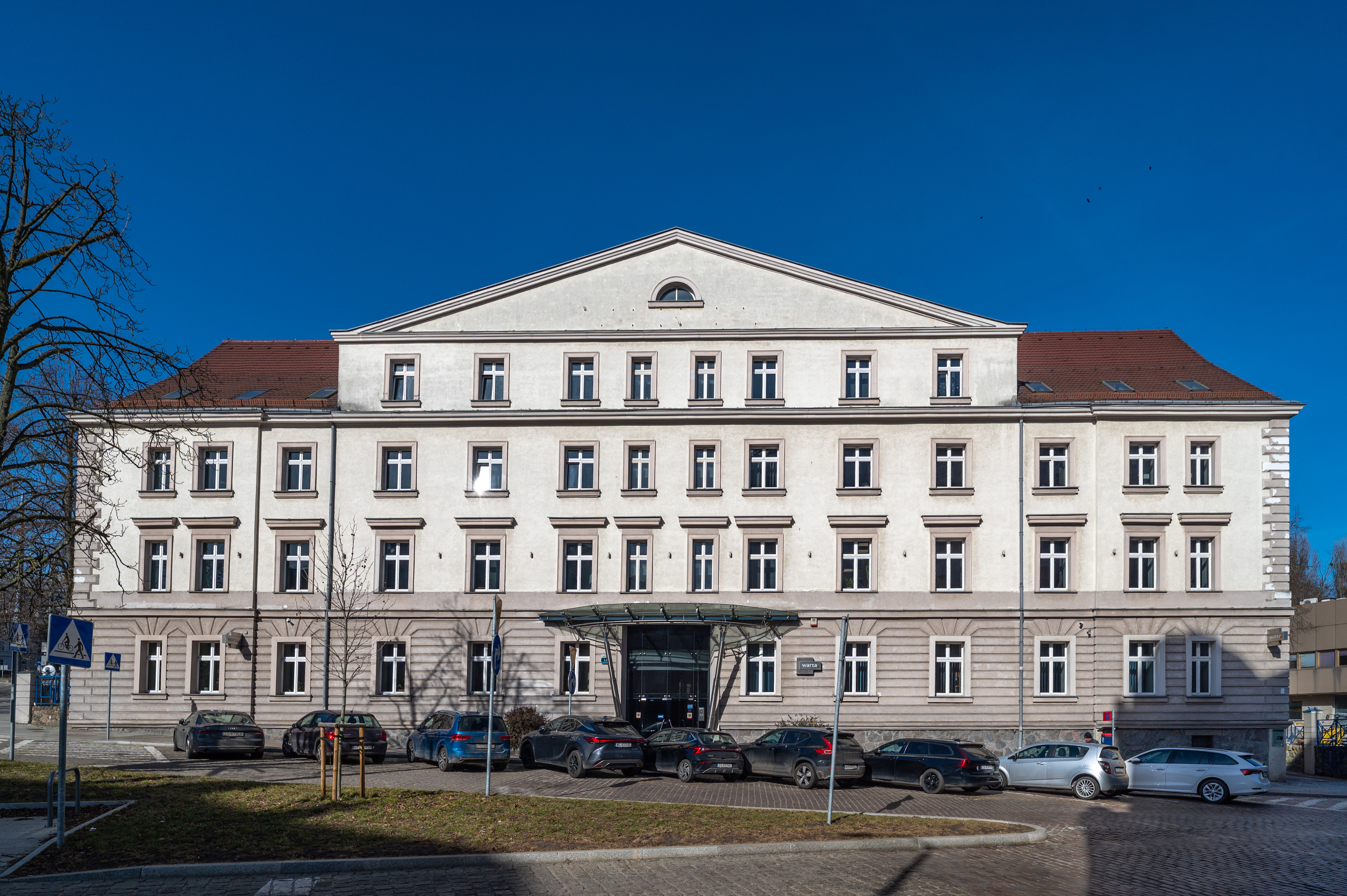
The front of the building.

In 1776, two large 4-storey tall barracks were built on the hill named Ox Mountain, alongside the current Podwale Street, and near the corner of Dworcowa and Św. Ducha Streets. They were placed near the Snail Bastion, dating to at least 17th century, which was expanded and modernised between 1724 and 1740. The buildings later became known as the Snail Gate Barracks, after the city gate, which stood nearby between 1824 and 1876. It received its named after a winding road leading to the bastion, with its shape reminiscent of a snail shell. The barracks housed around 440 soldiers of the Royal Prussian Army. In 1818, the outbuilding was built on Dworkowa Street next to the barracks. Its façade was designed in the neoclassical style. It housed the mess hall. The barracks buildings were demolished at the beginning of the 20th century, leaving only the outbuilding.

Following the renovations in 2001, the building begun housing the Szczecin branch of the insurance company TUiR Warta.
