= Pomorzany =

Neighbourhood of Szczecin, Poland

- Municipal neighbourhood
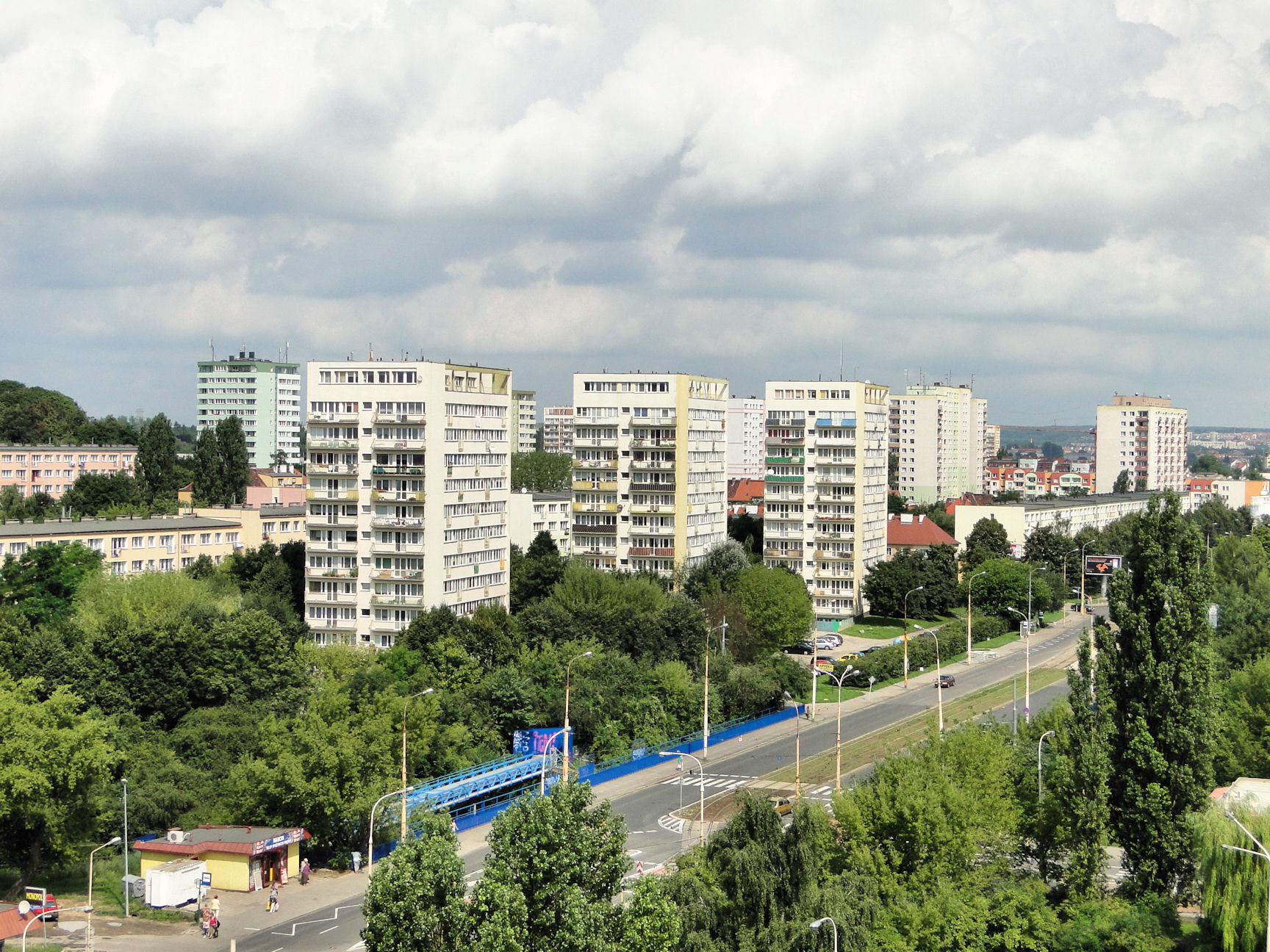
- Apartment buildings in Pomorzany, at the corner of Powstańców Wielkopolskich Avenue and Frysztacka Street, in 2010.

- Location within Szczecin
- Coordinates: 53°23′58″N 14°31′34″E
- Country: Poland
- Voivodeship: West Pomeranian
- City and county: Szczecin
- District: West
- Seat: 1 Włościańska Street

Area
  - Total: 7.05 km^{2} (2.72 sq mi)

Population (2025)
  - Total: 17,049
  - Density: 2,420/km^{2} (6,260/sq mi)
- Time zone: UTC+1 (CET)
  - Summer (DST): UTC+2 (CEST)
- Area code: +48 91
- Car plates: ZS

Pomorzany (Polish: [pɔ.mɔˈʐa.nɘ̟]; German until 1945: Pommerensdorf ['pɔməʁ.ɛns.dɔrf]) is a municipal neighbourhood of Szczecin, Poland, located within the West district. It is a mid-rise housing estate dominated by tenement houses. Pomorzany has an area of 7.05 km^{2} (2.72 sq mi), and in 2025, was inhabited by 17,049 people, making it the fourth most populous neighbourhood. It is a residential neighbourhood with mid-rise apartment buildings, which also features numerous factories.

The first traces of human activity in the area of today's Pomorzany date from the late Neolithic period. The human settlement stabilised in the area in the 8th century, and the village of Pomorzany was first attested in the documents in 1253. Its northern part was incorporated into the city in 1864, and the rest, in 1939. In the second half of the 19th century, numerous factories were opened in the neighbourhood. Beginning in the 1960s, several mid-rise housing estates with apartment buildings were developed in the neighbourhood.

== Toponomy ==
Historically, the neighbourhood was known by the German name Pommerensdorf, which, coming from lemmas Pommeren, meaning Pomerania, and dorf, meaning village, translates to Pomeranian village. The current Polish name Pomorzany is the calque of the former, with the term Pomorze, also meaning Pomerania.

== History ==
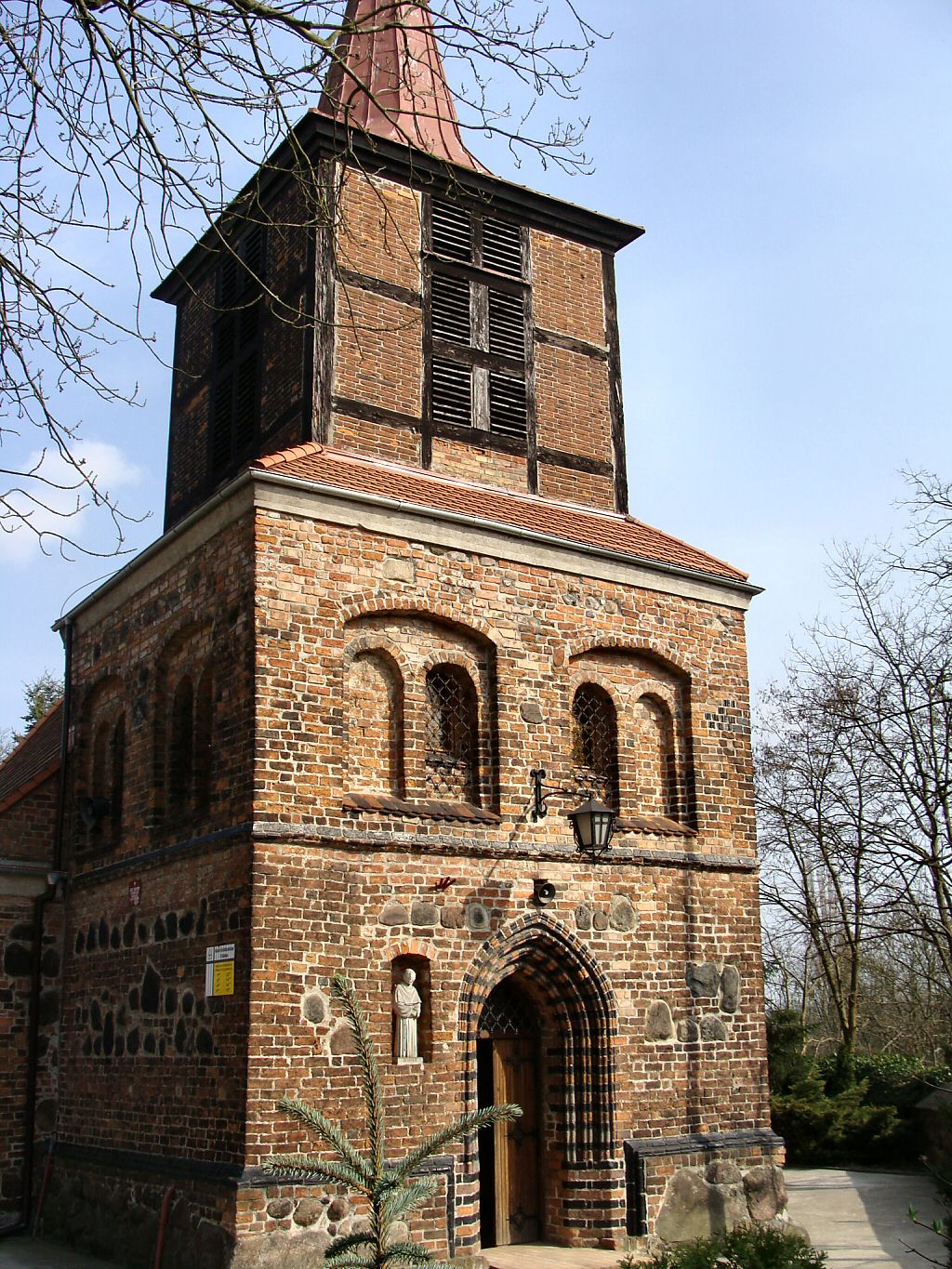
The St. Maximilian Maria Kolbe Church, dating to the 14th century.

The oldest known traces of human activity in the area of the modern Pomorzany date to the late Neolithic period. A permanent settlement was founded in the area in the 8th century. The oldest records of Pomorzany, then a small farming community, date to documents issued by duke Barnim I on 8 May 1253, where it was recorded under the name Pomerenstorp. In the following centuries, the spelling evolved to Pommerensdorf. In the 14th century, a Gothic Roman Catholic church was built the village, being situated on a slope paved with field stones and surrounded by a defensive wall. Its denomination was changed to Lutheranism during the Protestant Reformation in the 16th century. The building was destroyed in 1559 by the Swedish Imperial Army during the siege of Szczecin in the Scanian War, and was rebuilt afterwards. Later, it was rebuilt once more, eventually losing its Gothic appearance. The church was destroyed again during the Second World War. It was rebuilt in 1973, being reopened as a seat of a Roman Catholic parish, under the name St. Maximilian Maria Kolbe Church. A small cemetery yard was placed next to the church, being cleared out in 1978. The building is located 67 and 69 Włościańska Street.

In 1865, the Pomorzany Cemetery was founded between the current Powstańców Wielkopolskich Avenue and Grudziądzka Street, to serve as the burial site for the local population. It had an area of around 11 ha (27.18 acres) In 1879, a hospital complex was opened to the south of the cemetery, at the current 72 Powstańców Wielkopolskich Avenue, now known as the University Teaching Hospital no. 2 of the Pomeranian Medical University. The burials at the cemetery were ceased in 1928, and in 1938, its southern half was cleared to make space for the extension of the hospital, with the graves being moved to the Central Cemetery. After the Second World War, its remaining portion was also cleared out, and turned into an urban park, nowk known as the General Dowbór-Muśnicki Pomorzany Park, measuring 5.5 ha (13.59 acres).

The northern part of the village, known as Pommerensdorfer Anlagen (lit. 'Extension of Pomorzany'), was incorporated into the city of Szczecin in 1864, with the current streets of Dziewiątego Maja, Smolańska, Szczawiowa, and Bydgoska, forming the municipal boundary. The rest of the settlement was absorbed on 15 October 1939.

In 1893, the Martin Luther Church, which had a Lutheran denomination, was built at the current 1 Połabska Street in the Baroque Revival style. After the Second World War, its denomination was changed to Roman Catholicism in 1946, being renamed to the Church of St. Joseph the Favourite of Saint Mary.

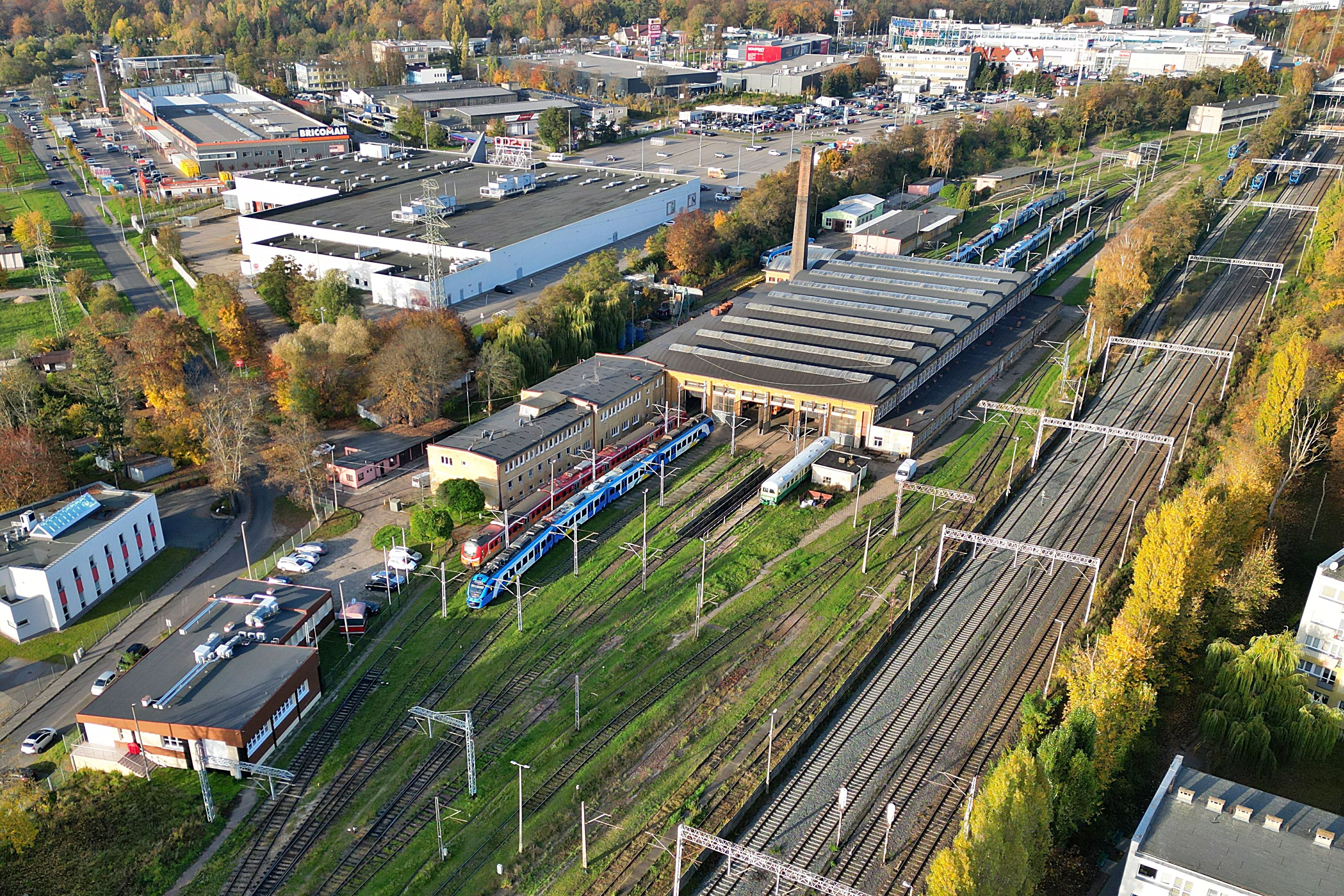
The Szczecin Wzgórze Hetmańskie locomotive depot, opened in 1936.

In 1898, the Szczecin Pomorzany railway station (German: Stettin Pommerensdorf) was opened near the current Grudziądzka Street, and operated on the line between Szczecin Main Station and Police. It was closed down in 1953, and was later reopened in 1984, at a new location near Powstańców Wielkopolskich Avenue, where it operated until 2002. In 1899, Pomorzany was also the final station on a narrow-gauge railway line leading to Casekow. The area of Pomorzany also included the narow-gauge stations of Pommerensdorf Kleinbahnhof (lit. 'narrow-gauge station') and Pommerensdorf Hafen (lit. 'harbour') near Bygdoska Street, and Güstow near the corner of Szczawiowa and Ustowska Streets, for the nearby village of Ustowo. The line was closed down in 1946, with most of the rail tracks being removed. Additionally, the Szczecin Wzgórze Hetmańskie railway station, originally known as Kosakenberg was opened in 1936 between the current Białowieska, Milczańska, and Orawska Streets. It operated passenger lines until 1998, and included a locomotive depot which remains in use to the present day.

Beginning in the second half of the 19th century, numerous factories were opened in the neighbourhood, as well as gasworks, a power plant, and a wastewater treatment plant Among the companies present, there was the brewery Bohrisch Brauerei, founded in 1848, which produced beer brand Waldschlösschen. It operated until 1945, and was reopened in Kiel, Germany in 1948. After the Second World War, the brewery building was reopened by the company Bosman Browar Szczecin, which began producing the beer brand Piwo Bałtyckie. In 1975, it acquired franchise rights to produce and bottle Pepsi soda drinks, as one of the first free companies in the country.

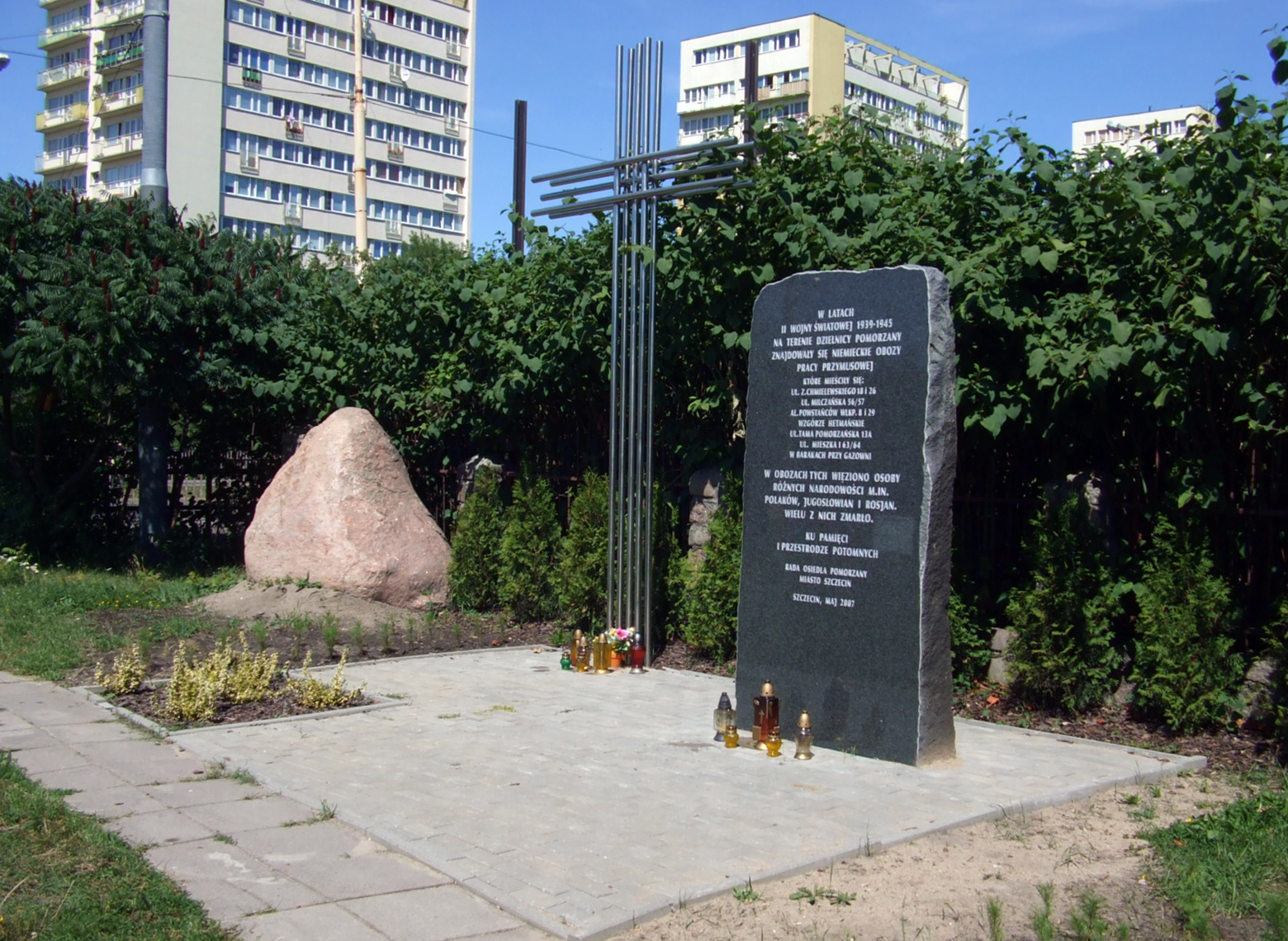
The monument dedicated to the victims of the Nazi Germany forced labour camps in Pomorzany during the Second World War.

During the Second World War, seven forced labour camps with prisoners from Poland, Yugoslavia, and the Soviet Union, among other countries. Many prisoners died in the camps. During the conflict, the Allied air raids destroyed numerous factories and residential buildings in the area. Following the end of the conflict, the German population either left or was expelled from the city, being replaced with Polish settlers. Szczecin, including Pomorzany, was given under Polish administration on 5 July 1945. In 2007, a monument dedicated to the victims of the local forced labour camps was unveiled at the corner of Powstańców Wielkopolskich Avenue and Smolańska Street.

Most of the local factories were reopened after the conflict. The neighbourhood remained sparsely populated until the late 1960s, when it began being developed with the construction of the mid-rise apartment buildings in its eastern side. Throughout the 1970s and 1980s, a mid-rise housing estate was also developed at the Hetman Hill (Polish: Wzgórze Hetmańskie). In 1984, a building of a water towar at 3 Orawska Street, dating to 1865, was modified and adopted as a Catholic church, named for Our Lady of the Bright Mountain.

In 1959, the Karol Świerczewski Bridge in Pomorzany, was opened at a crossing on the West Oder river, connected to Krygiera Street. It was built by the Polish Armed Forces, and replaced a provisional bridge, erected there in 1948, with financing from the United Kingdom. It in turn, was built in place of another bridge, which was destroyed by the Red Army during the Second World War. It was closed in 2008, being replaced with the neighbouring Pomeranian Bridge.

In 1990, following the administrative reform in the city, Pomorzany became one of its municipal neighbourhoods, governed by a locally elected council.

In 1992, the Polish Atherosclerosis Research Association was founded with its headquarters in Pomorzany, at 72 Powstańców Wielkopolskich Avenue.

In 2000, the Omni Molo shopping centre was opened at 73 Mieszka I Street, with a floor area of 26,235 m^{2}. It was originally known as Piast, later being renamed to Atrium Molo, and again, to its current name in 2023. In 2020, the Retail Park Mieszka was opened it next to it, with the floor area of 10,000 m^{2}. Additionally, in 2008, in the municipality of Kołbaskowo, near the city boundary, Pomorzany neighbourhood, and the village of Ustowo, was opened the Auchan Kołbaskowo shopping centre, with the floor area of 21,731 m^{2}. It is placed at 45 Ustowo Street.

== Overview ==
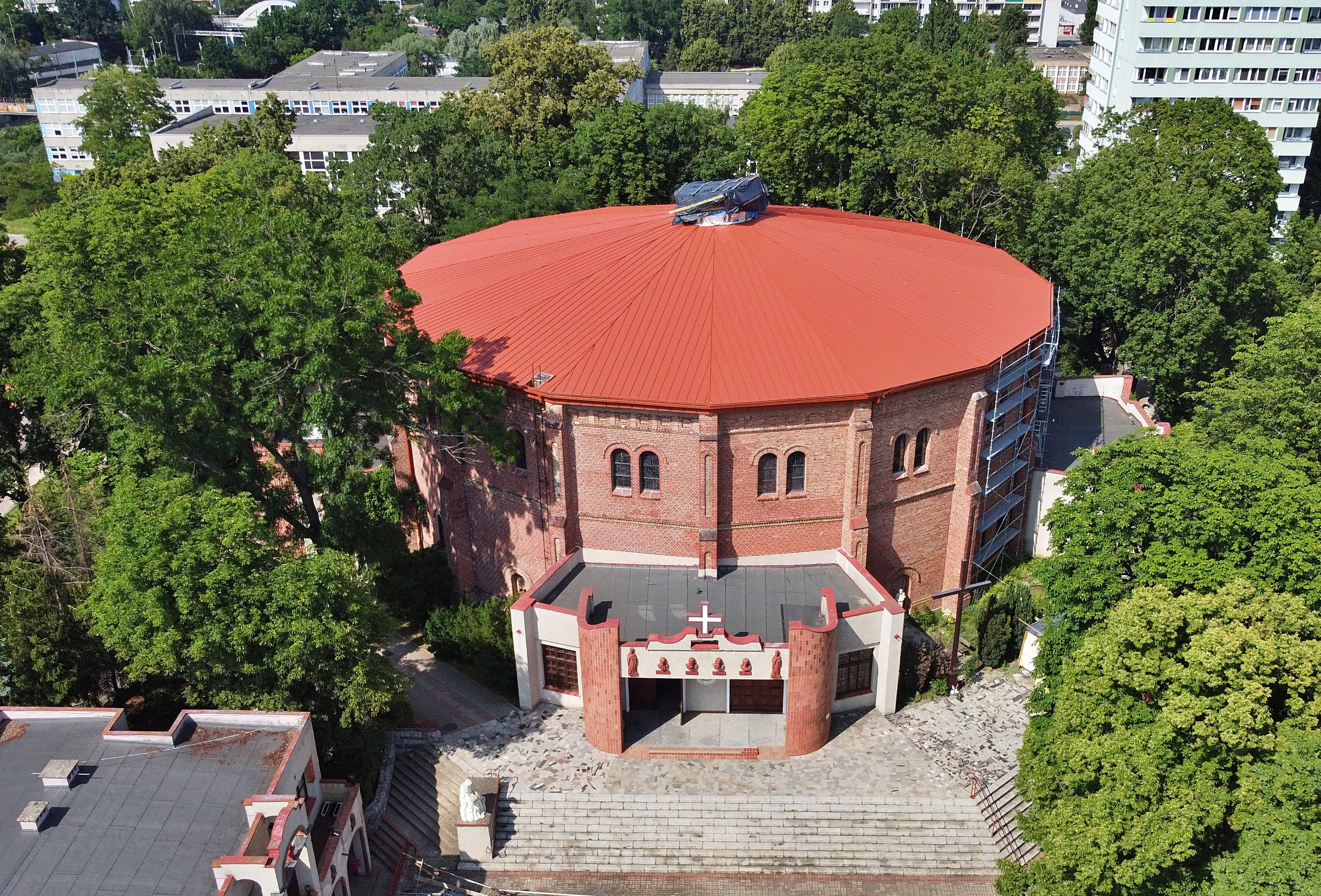
The Our Lady of the Bright Mountain Church.

Pomorzany is a residential neighbourhood with mid-rise apartment buildings. It also features numerous factories, including the brewery Bosman Browar Szczecin, which produces beer brand Browar Bałtycki. The neighbourhood features the General Dowbór-Muśnicki Pomorzany Park, with an area of 5.5 ha, placed between Powstańców Wielkopolskich Avenue, Starkiewicza Street, and Grudziącka Street. To its south is also placed the complex of the University Teaching Hospital no. 2 of the Pomeranian Medical University, located at 72 Powstańców Wielkopolskich Avenue.

Pomorzany has three churches of the Catholic denomination, including the St. Maximilian Maria Kolbe Church at 67 and 69 Włościańska Street, whose history dates to the 14th century. There are also present the Church of St. Joseph the Favourite of Saint Mary at 1 Połabska Street, dating to 1893, and the Our Lady of the Bright Mountain Church at 3 Orawska Street, which was opened in 1984, with the building adopted from a water tower dating to 1865.

Within the neighbourhood is located the Szczecin Wzgórze Hetmańskie locomotive deepot, located between Białowieska, Milczańska, and Orawska Streets. Additionally, near Grudziądzka Street is placed now closed Szczecin Pomorzany railway station, which operated from 1984 to 2002.

The eastern boundary of the neighbourhood is formed by the West Oder river, and it features the Pomeranian Brige, with the length of 205.75 m, which forms the crossing to the Pucka Island, as part of Krygiera Street. Next it is placed now closed Karol Świerczewski Bridge, as well, as two railroad briges of the line no. 351.

Pomorzany includes the Omni Molo shopping centre at 73 Mieszka I Street, with the floor area of 26,235 m^{2}, and the neighbouring Retail Park Mieszka with the floor area of 10,000 m^{2}. Additionally, near the city boundary, next to Pomorzany and village of Ustowo, is placed the Auchan Kołbaskowo shopping centre, with the floor area of 21,731 m^{2}. It is placed at 45 Ustowo Street.

At the corner of Powstańców Wielkopolskich Avenue and Smolańska Street, is placed a monument dedicated to the victims of the Nazi Germany forced labour camps in Pomorzany during the Second World War.

The Polish Atherosclerosis Research Association has its headquarters in Pomorzany, at 72 Powstańców Wielkopolskich Avenue.

== Demographics ==
Historical population
Year	2008	2009	2010	2011	2012	2013	2014	2015	2016	2017	2018	2019	2020	2021	2022	2023	2024	2025
Pop.	22,776	22,564	21,972	21,640	21,684	21,418	21,156	20,782	20,515	20,181	19,785	19,464	19,120	18,748	18,134	17,729	17,377	17,049
±%	—	−0.9%	−2.6%	−1.5%	+0.2%	−1.2%	−1.2%	−1.8%	−1.3%	−1.6%	−2.0%	−1.6%	−1.8%	−1.9%	−3.3%	−2.2%	−2.0%	−1.9%

== Government ==
Pomorzany is one of the municipal neighbourhoods of Szczecin, governed by a locally elected council with 21 members. Its headquarters are located at 1 Włościańska Street.

Its boundaries are approximately determined by Powstańców Wielkopolskich Avenue, the tracks of the railway line no. 406, Generalska Street, Dąbrowskiego Street, Zapadła Street, the West Oder river, Krygiera Street, Południowa Street, the tracks of the railway line no. 432, Białowieska Street, and Mieszka I Street. Pomorzany borders the neighbourhoods of Gumieńce, Turzyn, New Town, and Międzyodrze-Wyspa Pucka. Its southern boundary forms the city border, neighbouring the municipality of Kołbaskowo in the Police County, including the village of Ustowo. The neighbourhood has a total area of 7.05 km^{2} (2.72 sq mi).
