= Thornett =

Thornett is a surname. Notable people with the surname include:

- Alan Thornett (born 1937), British Trotskyist leader
- Dick Thornett (1940–2011), one of five Australians to have represented their country in three sports
- Jan Thornett, married name of Jan Andrew (born 1943), Australian butterfly swimmer and Olympic medallist
- John Thornett (1935–2019), Australian rugby union player
- Ken Thornett (born 1937), Australian rugby league footballer

== See also ==
- Thorne (disambiguation)
- Thorner
- Thorney (disambiguation)
- Tornat
