= Turzyn =

Neighbourhood of Szczecin, Poland

- Municipal neighbourhood
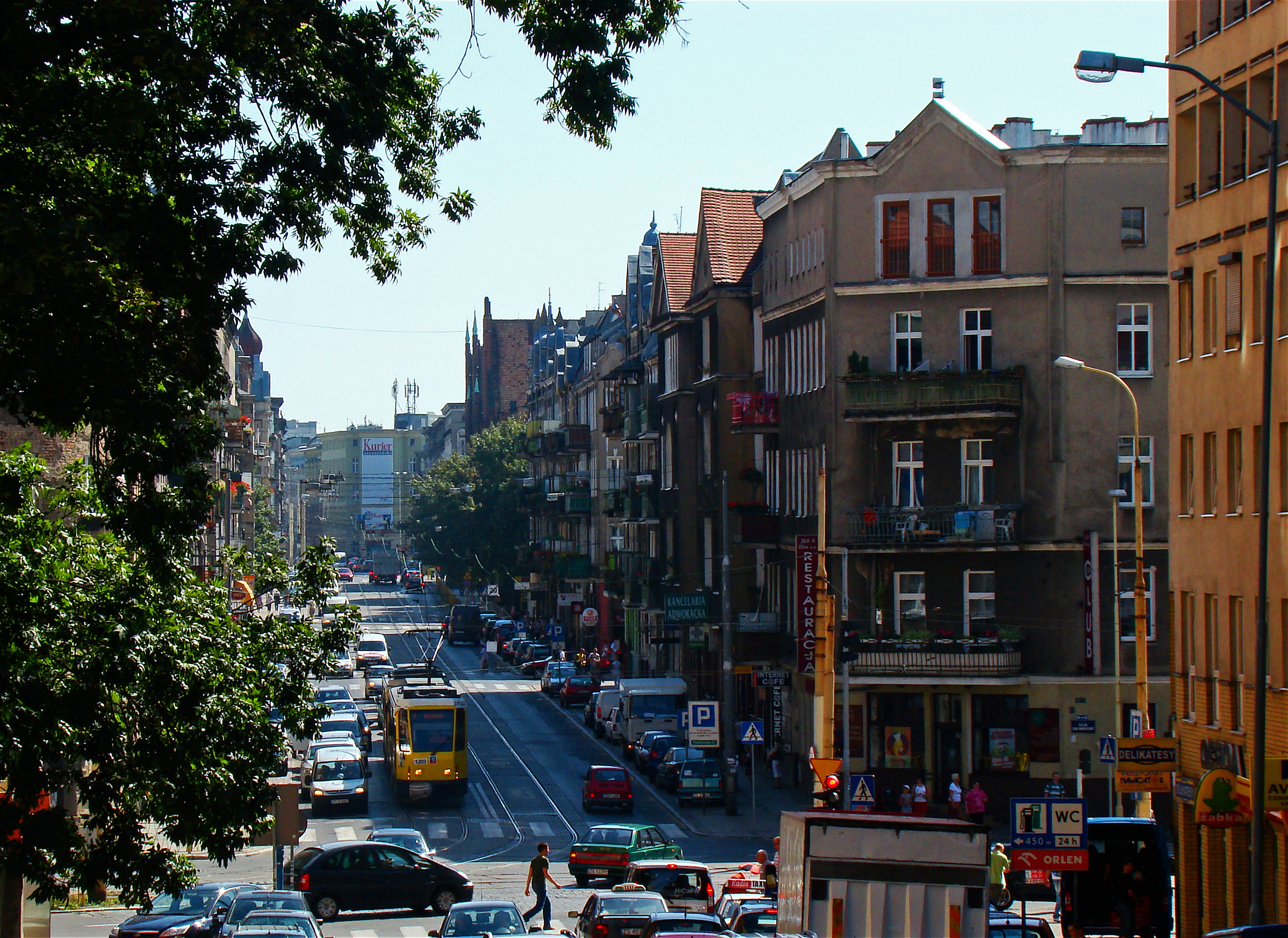
- Jagiellonska Street in Turzyn in 2009.

- Location within Szczecin

- Map of Turzyn
- Coordinates: 53°25′36″N 14°31′51″E
- Country: Poland
- Voivodeship: West Pomeranian
- City and county: Szczecin
- District: Downtown
- Seat: 17 Pocztowa Street

Area
  - Total: 1.57 km^{2} (0.61 sq mi)

Population (2025)
  - Total: 16,508
  - Density: 10,500/km^{2} (27,200/sq mi)
- Time zone: UTC+1 (CET)
  - Summer (DST): UTC+2 (CEST)
- Area code: +48 91
- Car plates: ZS

Turzyn (Polish: [ˈtuʐ.ɘ̟n]; German until 1945: Torney [tɔʁˈnɛɪ̯]) is a municipal neighbourhood of Szczecin, Poland, located within the Downtown district. It is a mid-rise housing estate dominated by tenement houses. Turzyn has an area of 1.57 km^{2}, and in 2025, was inhabited by 16,508 people, making it the fifth most populous neighbourhood in the city. Turzyn dates to the High Middle Ages, when it was a small farming community. By the 20th century, it developed into a suburb, and was incorporated into the city in 1910.

== Toponomy ==
The name for Turzyn, historically known in German as Torney, comes from Slavic term for blackthorn, a species of a flowering plant in the rose family, comparably known colloquially in Polish as tarń. The village was named as such, as the plant grew in the fields surrounding it. Historically, Torney was also recorded with spellings Turnei and Turney.

== History ==
In the High Middle Ages, Turzyn was a small farming community, located next to the city's boundaries of Szczecin, near the Passau Gate. The settlement, together with surrounded it farmlands, known as the Turzyn Municipal Field (German: Torneyer Stadtfelde; Polish: turzyńskie pole miejskie), were owned by the St. George Hospital Church (also known as the St. George Chapel). The building itself, located near the Passau Gate, probably near the current corner of Dworcowa and Trzeciego Maja Streets, was founded in 1335, and operated by the Kalands Brethren of the Catholic denomination, together with an adjacent hospital. From 1557, the area was owned by the St. John the Evangelist Church in Szczecin. By that time, three windmills were located in the village.

Between 1637 and 1639, the village was occupied by the Swedish army during the Thirty Years' War. It was subsequently destroyed by the soldiers stationed there, including its residential and farm buildings and the church. It was rebuilt, however, it was again occupied and partially destroyed in November 1659, when Szczecin was besieged by the Austrian and Brandenburgian forces during the Northern War. The village was rebuilt afterwards. The church building, which had been abandoned since 1657, was not rebuilt, and only its cemetery was left behind, before also disappearing across centuries.

In the 17th century, the Swedish military built fortifications on the farm fields near Turzyn, including a bastion fort, known as the Star Fort (German: Sternschanze; Polish: Gwiaździsty Szaniec). After the area became part of the Kingdom of Prussia in 1720, the fortifications around Turzyn were rebuilt and expanded, forming the Fort Prussia, which was finished in 1741. Its construction necessitated the destruction of the village, which, after 1736, was resettled further to the north-west, around current Kordeckiego and Bohaterów Warszawy Streets. A new settlement had around 60 buildings, placed around a central town square. It was destroyed again in 1813, during the siege of Szczecin in the Napoleon's German campaign. The village was rebuilt in 1817, at a new location in the area of the current Wawrzyniaka, Mickiewicza, Piątego Lipca, and Ściegiennego Streets. The new settlement became known as Nowy Turzyn (German: Neu Torney, lit. New Turzyn), while the previous village was retroactively known as Stary Turzyn (German: Alt Torney, lit. Old Turzyn). The fortifications were deconstructed after 1873.

In 1815, the Turzyn Cemetery was established between the current Mickiewicza, Noakowskiego and Jagiellońska Streets. Upon it nearing its maximum capacity, the city limited the number of burials and turned a large portion into a park. The burials continued at reduced rate until 1928. In the 1960s, the cemetery was cleared and turned into the Stanisław Noakowski Park.

In 1878, at the intersection of Piastów Avenue, Bolesława Krzywoustego Street and Sikorskiego Street, was opened the Schinkel Square, now known as the Tadeusz Kościuszko Square. Next to it was also adjacent a garden square, now known as the Janina Szczerska Square.

By the early 20th century, the area developed into a suburb, and in 1910, it was incorporated into the city of Szczecin.

In 1898, in the village, next to the current corner of Bohaterów Warszawy and Dwudziestego Szóstego Kwietnia Streets, was opened the Szczecin Turzyn railway station, originally known as Torney, and later Stettin-Torney. On 4 October 1946, two passenger trains collided at the station, killing 7 people, and leaving 15 injured.

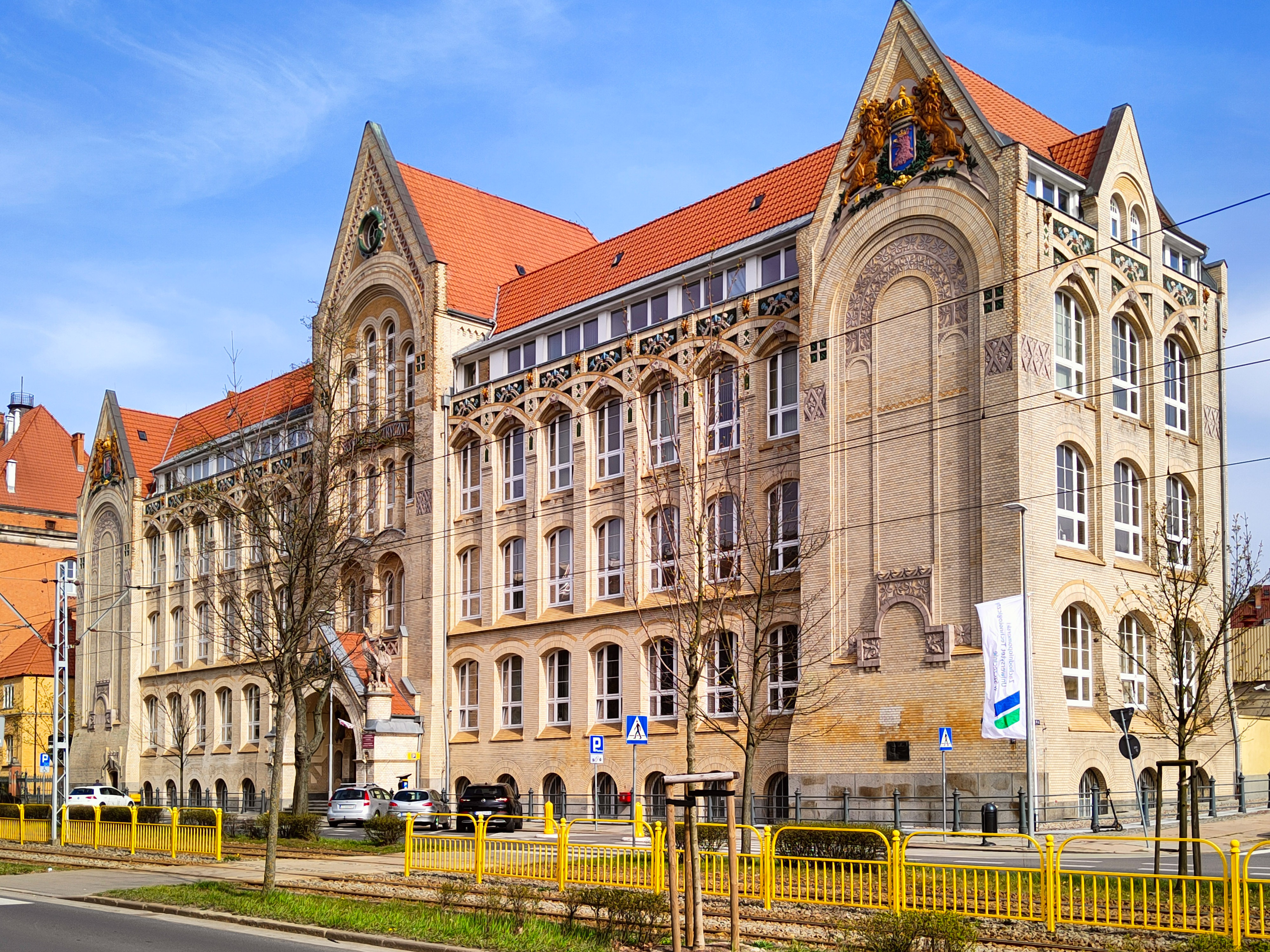
The building of the Faculty of Electrical Engineering of the West Pomeranian University of Technology, built in 1901 for the Royal Higher School of Mechanical Engineering.

In 1901, at the current 37 Sikorskiego Street and 10 Piastów Avenue were opened two buildings of the Royal Higher School of Mechanical Engineering, a state vocational school. It operated until 1945. In 1946, the Szczecin University of Technology, originally known as the Szczecin School of Engineering, was founded, with its headquarters at 37 Sikorskiego Street, in the former building of the Royal Higher School of Mechanical Engineering. It was established as a branch of the Poznań University of Technology, before becoming an independent institution the following year. In the following years, its campus acquired neighbouring buildings, including 10 Pułaskiego Street, and 17, 19, and 50 Piast Avenue, and had few others constructed nearby. In 1947, it offered education at faculties of electrical, land, and mechanical engineering, and was later expanded with chemistry and architecture, among others.

In 1933, at the current 22 Pocztowa Street was opened the St. Nicholas Church of the lutheran denomination. Following the end of the Second World War in 1945, the building was donated to the Jesuit Order of the Catholic denomination, and renamed to the St. Andrew Bobola Church. Following the renovations, it was reopened in 1952. Between 1955 and 1957, Jesuits were forced by the communist government to leave the city, being deemed to have a "bad influence on the youth and intelligentsia". In 1967, the church housed Agostino Casaroli, who was sent by the Holy See for the negotiations with the government of the Polish People's Republic. During the period of the martial law, which took place from 1981 to 1983, the church was used in distributing international aid, and numerous people involved in its activities were placed in the internment camps.

In 1935, a children's hospital was opened at the current 44 Jagiellońska Street. Currently, in its building operates the Independent Public Health Care Facility of the Ministry of Internal Affairs of the Administration.

In the 1960s, at the corner of Bohaterów Warszawy and Dwudziestego Szóstego Kwietnia Streets, was founded the Turzyn Marketplace, the second oldest, and the largest marketplace in the post-war city, after vendors moved there from the closed Tobruk Martketplace in the New Town. In 2001, the shopping mall Turzyn was opened in its central portion, with a vendor area of 27,500 m^{2}. In 2011, to the north was also opened the Nowy Turzyn shopping centre, with a vendor area of 14,185 m^{2}. Only the souther portion of the marketplace remains to the present day, making it the second largest in the city.

In 1990, following the administrative reform in the city, Turzyn became one of its neighbourhoods governed by a locally elected council.

In 2009, the Agricultural University of Szczecin and the Szczecin University of Technology, were joined, forming the West Pomeranian University of Technology. The latter's campus was adopted by the new school, with the building at 37 Sikorskiego Street housing its Faculty of Electrical Engineering.

In 2022, at a garden square between Bohaterów Warszawy Avenue, Bema Street, and Sikorskiego Street, was unveiled a bronze statue dedicated to Mikhail Dolivo-Dobrovolsky, a 19th- and 20th-century engineer, electrician, and inventor. It was designed by sculptor Marian Molenda. The square it was placed at is also named in honour to Dolivo-Dobrovolsky.

== Characteristics ==
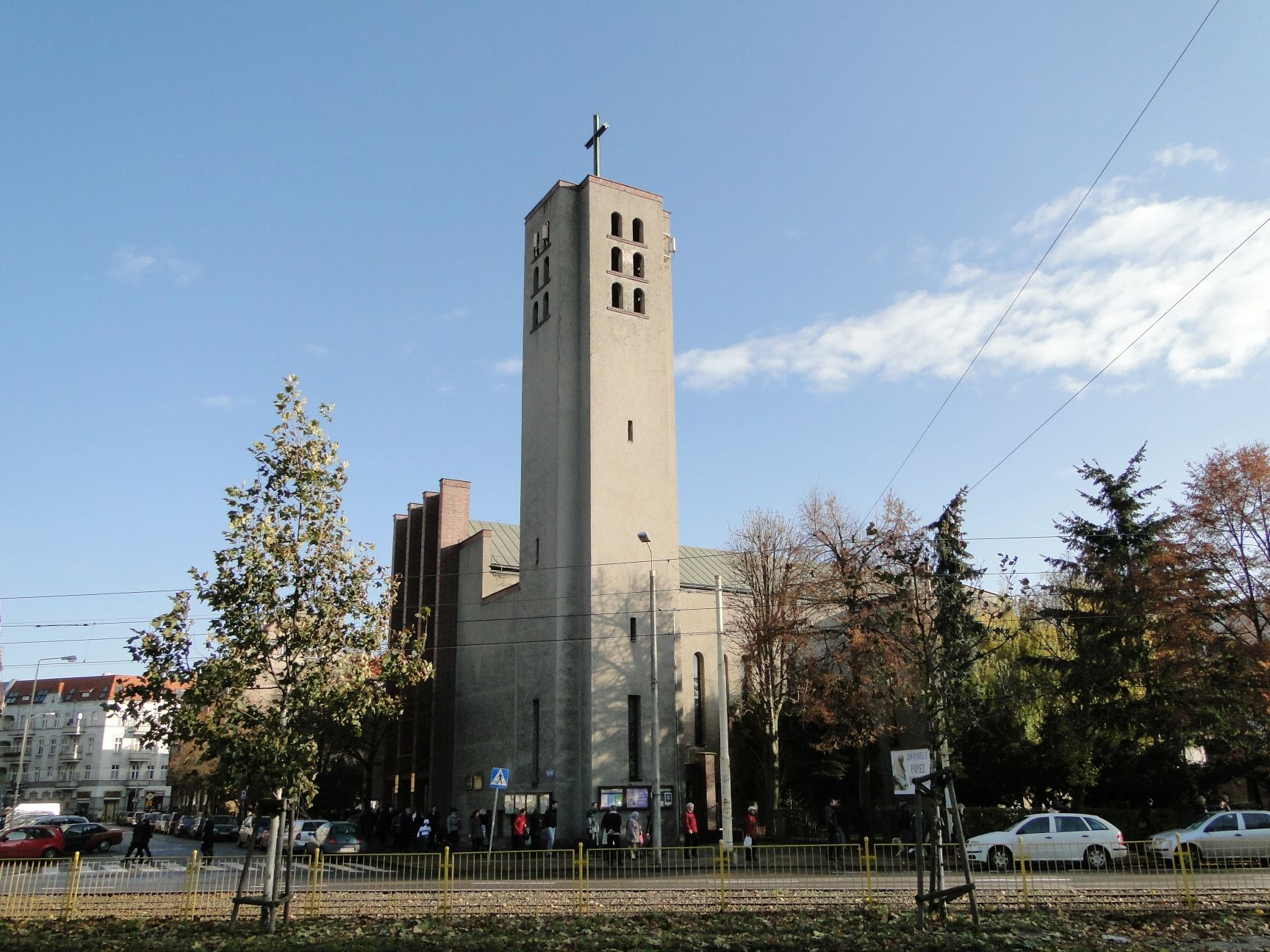
The St. Andrew Bobola Church.

The neighbourhood consists of mid-rise housing, dominated by tenement houses. In the northeaster corner of Turzyn, between Mickiewicza, Noakowskiego and Jagiellońska Streets, is located the Stanisław Noakowski Park. It is neighboured by the Independent Public Health Care Facility of the Ministry of Internal Affairs of the Administration at 44 Jagiellońska Street. Additionally, at the intersection of Piastów Avenue, Bolesława Krzywoustego Street and Sikorskiego Street, is located the Tadeusz Kościuszko Square, with an adjacent garden square, known as the Janina Szczerska Square. To the south, between Bohaterów Warszawy Avenue, Bema Street, and Sikorskiego Street, is placed the Mikhail Dolivo-Dobrovolsky Square, which features a state dedicated to its namesake, unveiled in 2022.

A portion of the campus of the West Pomeranian University of Technology is located within Turzyn, including the Faculty of Electrical Engineering at 37 Sikorskiego Street and the Faculty of Chemical Technology and Engineering at 42 Piastów Avenue.

Within the neighbourhood, at 40 and 42 Bohaterów Warszawy Street, are located shopping centres Nowy Turzyn and Turzyn, with the shopping areas of 14,185 and 27,500 m^{2} respectively. Next to them, at the corner with Dwudziestego Szóstego Kwietnia Street is also placed the Turzyn Marketplace, which is the second largest marketplace in the city.

Within Turzyn are also present the St. Andrew Bobola Church of the Catholic denomination, at 22 Pocztowa Street, and the Church of the Protection of Our Lady of the Eastern Orthodox denomination, at 43 Mickiewicza Street.

== Government and boundaries ==
Turzyn is one of the municipal neighbourhoods of Szczecin, governed by a locally elected council with 21 members. Its headquarters are located at 17 Pocztowa Street.

Its boundaries are approximately determined by Mickiewicza Street, Bolesława Śmiałego Street, Grey Ranks Square, Piątego Lipca Street, Piastów Avenue, Mieszka I Street, and alongside the tracks of the railway line no. 406. The neighbourhood borders Łękno, Downtown-North, Centre, Downtown-West, New Town, Pomorzany, Gumieńce, Świerczewo, and Pogodno. Turzyn has a total area of 1.57 km^{2}.
