= Włodzimierz Kiernożycki =

Polish Engineer and Professor (1951-2025)

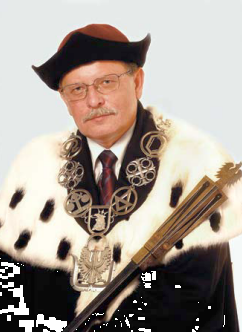
- Born: 30 May 1951; Poznań, Polish People's Republic
- Died: 15 February 2025 (aged 73); Szczecin, Poland
- Resting place: Bródno Cemetery
- Occupation(s): Engineer and Professor

Włodzimierz Kiernożycki (30 May 1951 – 15 February 2025) was a Polish engineer, professor of technical sciences in the fields of construction, reinforced concrete structures and building materials, academic teacher, rector of the Szczecin University of Technology (2005–2008), and then of the West Pomeranian University of Technology (2009–2016).

Kiernożycki published approximately 100 scientific works, including 6 monographic studies. He was the author or co-author of over 30 expert opinions and scientific and technical studies implemented in engineering practice. He participated in work carried out under the PR-8 and CPBR government programs. He was the manager of 3 projects financed by the KBN, and he managed an investment task financed by the Polish Science and Technology Fund.

== Selected publications ==
- The influence of corundum sand on the properties of cement concrete. “Matter. Bud.” 2023, 9, (collaborator Elżbieta Horszczaruk)
- The influence of temperature on the hydration rate of cements based on calorimetric measurements. "Materials" 2021, 14(11), 3025 (collaborator Jarosław Błyszko)
- From the Second Polish Republic to Western Pomerania: the centenary of Poland regaining independence. In: "70 years of academic tradition in Western Pomerania" 2020
- Causes of failures of industrial floors and concrete surfaces – case study. MATEC Web of Conferences 2019, 284 (collaborator Jarosław Błyszko)
- Some material conditions of the concrete composition of massive structures. in: "Selected theoretical and experimental issues in research on building materials and structures: collective work" 2017 (collaborator Jolanta Borucka-Lipska)
- Massive concrete structures. Publisher Polski Cement sp. z o. o. 2003, 320 pp.
- Rheological properties of early age concrete in tension. “Arch. Civil Engineering.” 2001, 47, 3, pp. 385–387 (collaborator P. Freidenberg)
- Effect of the temperature rise as a result of concrete hydration on the massive concrete walls. “Eng. Budownictwo” 1976, 33, 1, pp. 19–22 (collaborator Janusz Kurzawa)

== Decorations and awards ==
- 2nd degree award of the Ministry of Science and Higher Education (1981)
- 2nd Degree Award of the Minister of Spatial Management and Construction (1990)
- Award named after prof. Wacław Żenczykowski (1995)
- Golden Cross of Merit (1996)
- Award of the Minister of Infrastructure (2003)
- Medal of the National Education Commission (2003)
- Medal of prof. Stefan Kaufman (2011)
- Knight's Cross of the Order of Polonia Restituta (2011)
