= The Fiery Birds =

Sculpture in Warsaw, Poland

- The sculpture in 2026.
- Interactive map of The Fiery Birds
- Location: Kasprowicz Park, Szczecin, Poland
- Coordinates: 53.444760°N 14.532817°E
- Designer: Władysław Hasior
- Type: Sculpture
- Material: Steel
- Length: 26 m (85 ft)
- Height: 2 m (6 ft 7 in)
- Opening date: 1975 (original location); 1994 (current location)

The Fiery Birds (Polish: Ogniste ptaki) is a modernist steel sculpture in Szczecin, Poland, placed in the Kasprowicz Park, depicting eighteen colourful birds. It was designed by Władysław Hasior, and originally unveiled in 1975 next to the Ducal Castle. In 1980, it was moved to the Concord Square, and again, in 1994, to its current location.

== History ==
The sculpture 'The Fiery Birds was designed by Władysław Hasior and unveiled in 1975. It was placed on a hill next to the Ducal Castle, as part of the author's art exhibition that was at the time hosted in the building. It consisted of fourteen individual modernist sculptures of birds of various sizes, made from metal sheets, rebars, chains, and structural steel profiles. They were painted in silver colour, and placed in a line, though with some aberration from the centre. During the unveiling ceremony, some elements of the sculpture were set on fire.

In 1980, in Koszalin was unveiled its sister project titled Burning Birds.

The Fiery Birds was removed in 1979, due to the construction of the Castle Route motorway overpass. The sculpture underwent renovations during which it was repainted with colourful scheme, and unveiled at the Concord Square several months later in 1980. It was placed on a steel ramp, between Bałuki and Bogusława X Streets. The sculpture remained there until 1989, when it was removed to make place for construction of a multifamily residential building.

It remained in a warehouse until 1994, when it was relocated to the Kasprowicz Park. It was placed on a concrete pedestal on a side of a hill in front of Rusałka lake, and near the Summer Theatre. It was vandalised numerous times, and deteriorated over time, and was renovated in 2005, and 2009, and 2010.

== Characteristics ==
The Fiery Birds is located in the Kasprowicz Park, placed on a side of the hill facing the Rusałka lake, and near the Summer Theatre. It consists of 14 steel sculptures of colourful birds of various sizes, with sime elements revoking fire imaginary. They are depicted from the profile in modernist style, and placed on openwork wheels. Sculptures were made from rebars, chains, and structural steel profiles. They are placed in one line, on a thin concrete pedestal. It total, the sculpture is 26-metres-long, and 2-metre-tall.
