= Thorney =

Thorney and Thorny may refer to:

== Places in the United Kingdom ==
- Thorney, Buckinghamshire
- Thorney, Cambridgeshire
- Thorney, Nottinghamshire
- Thorney, Somerset

== Places in the United States ==
- Thorny Creek, West Virginia

== Other ==
- ST Thorney, a tugboat
- Thorny Hawkes (1852–1929), American baseball player
- Tim Thorney (1955–2021), Canadian singer-songwriter

== See also ==
- Thorney Island (disambiguation)
