= Concord Square (Szczecin) =

Square in Szczecin, Poland

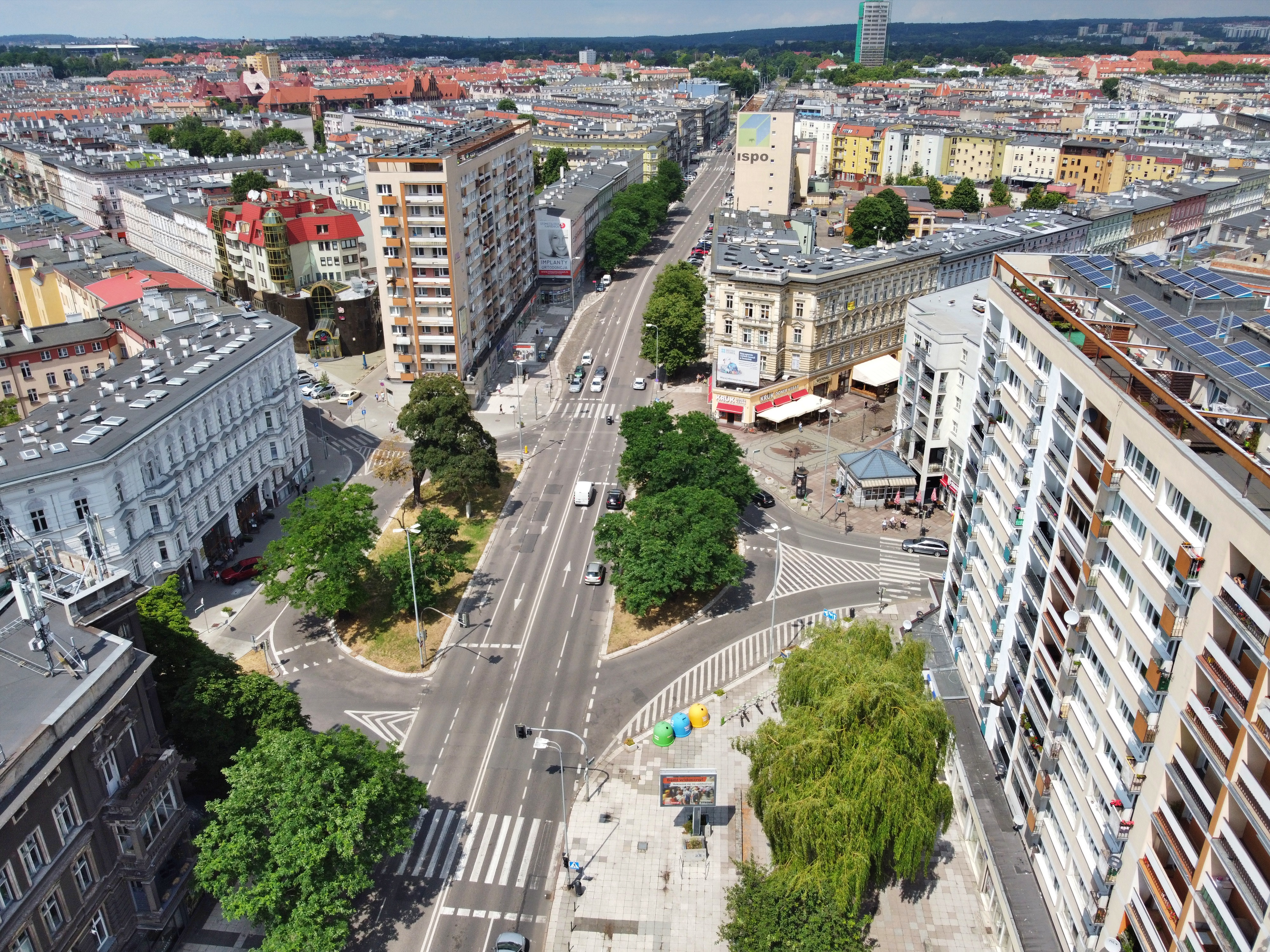
- The Concord Square in 2021.

- Location within Poland
- Type: Urban square
- Location: Szczecin, Poland
- Coordinates: 53°25′43.2″N 14°32′37.4″E
- North: Wojska Polskiego Avenue; Księcia Bogusława X Street
- East: Bałuki Street
- South: Wojska Polskiego Avenue; Księcia Bogusława X Street
- West: Bohaterów Getta Warszawskiego Street

Construction
- Completion: 1880s

The Concord Square (Polish: Plac Zgody) is an urban square in Szczecin, Poland. It is located in the district of Śródmieście, at the boundary of neighbourhoods of Centrum and Śródmieście-Zachód, at the intersection of Wojska Polskiego Avenue, Księcia Bogusława X Street, Bohaterów Getta Warszawskiego Street, and Bałuki Street.

== History ==
It was constructed in the 1880s, and named in 1880, the Bismarck Square (German: Bismarckplatz; Polish: Plac Bismarcka) after Otto von Bismarck, a 19th-century statesman and diplomat, best knosn for his role in the Unification of Germany, of which he was the chancellor from 1871 to 1890. Around the square were placed the four-storey-tall tenements.

The square was bombed in 1944, during the World War II, and the buildings around it were destroyed.

In 1945, it was renamed to the Concord Square, and on 1 March 1950, to the Polish–Soviet Friendship Square (Polish: Plac Przyjaźni Polsko-Radzieckiej). It was again renamed to the previous name in 1989.

In 1973, the tram line going through the square was removed, and im the 1980s around it were constructed new residential and commercial buildings.

In 1980, between Bałuki and Bogusława X Streets was unveiled modernist sculpture by Władysław Hasior, titled Fiery Birds. It consisted of eighteen colourful sculptures of birds of various sizes, standing on metal wheels, and placed on a steel ramp. It remained there until 1989, when it was removed to make place for construction of a multifamily residential building. In 1994, it was relocated to its current location in the Kasprowicz Park.

The Concord Square was remodeled in 2023. Its central part, previously dominated by crossing it Wojska Polskiego Avenue, was replaced by a pedestrian area. Additionally roads forming a roundabout around it, had their surface replaced from asphalt with pavement.

== Characteristics ==
The square is located in the district of Śródmieście, at the boundary of neighbourhoods of Centrum and Śródmieście-Zachód, at the intersection of Wojska Polskiego Avenue, Księcia Bogusława X Street, Bohaterów Getta Warszawskiego Street, and Bałuki Street. It is surrounded by the residencial and commercial buildings.
