= Ustowo =

- Village
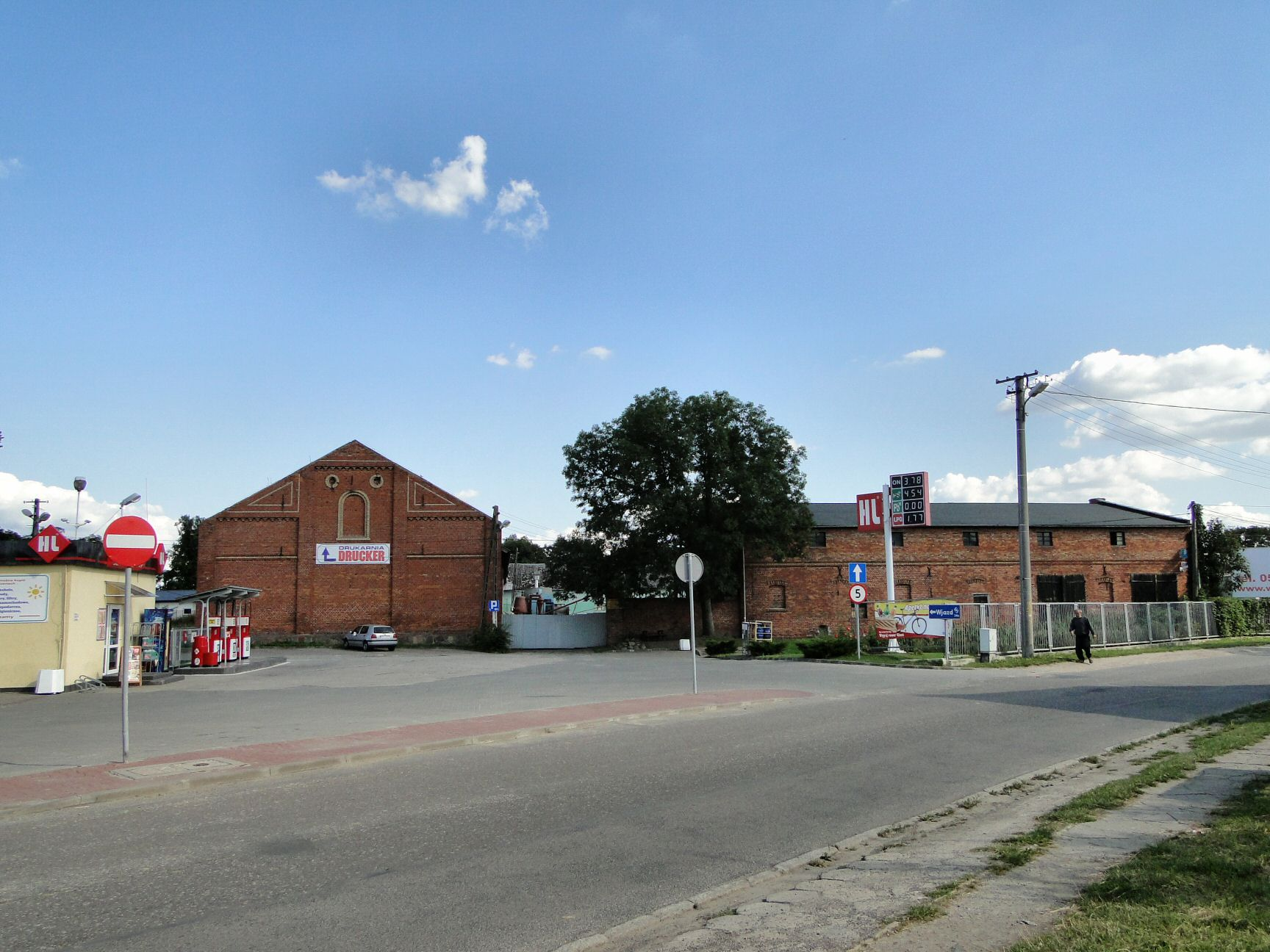
- Ustowo in 2009.

- Location within Poland
- Coordinates: 53°23′5″N 14°31′9″E
- Country: Poland
- Voivodeship: West Pomeranian
- County: Police
- Gmina: Kołbaskowo

Ustowo [usˈtɔvɔ] (German: Güstow) is a village in the administrative district of Gmina Kołbaskowo, within Police County, West Pomeranian Voivodeship, in north-western Poland, close to the German border. It lies approximately 17 km (11 mi) south of Police and 6 km (4 mi) south-west of the regional capital Szczecin.
