= Tadeusz Kościuszko Square =

Urban square in Szczecin, Poland

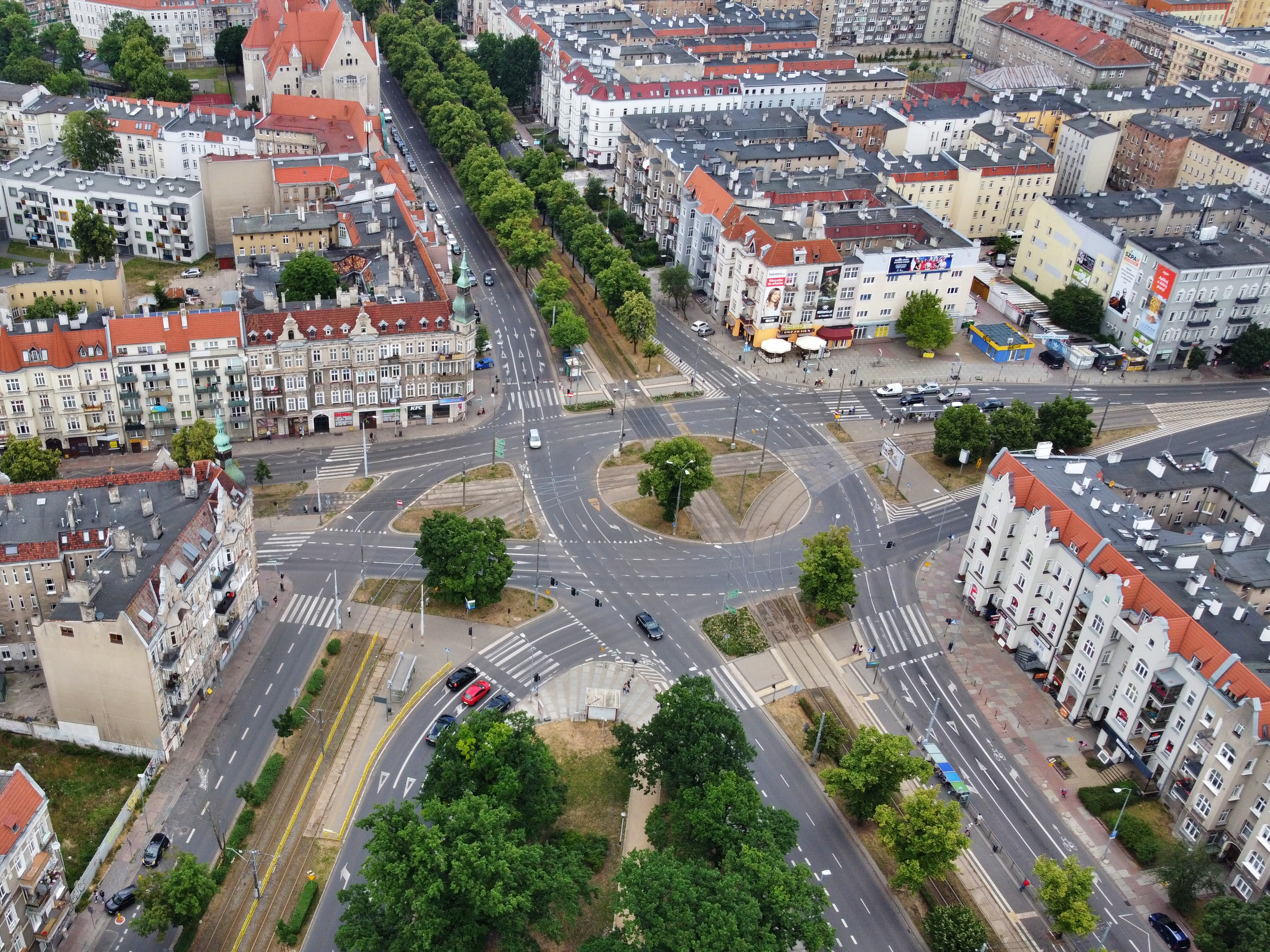
- The Tadeusz Kościuszko Square in 2021.

- Location within Poland
- Former name: Schinkel Square
- Namesake: Tadeusz Kościuszko
- Type: Urban square
- Location: Szczecin, Poland
- Coordinates: 53°25′37.5″N 14°32′14.4″E
- North: Piastów Avenue
- East: Krzywoustego Street
- South: Piastów Avenue
- West: Krzywoustego Street; Sikorskiego Street

Construction
- Construction start: 1877
- Completion: 1878

The Tadeusz Kościuszko Square, (Note: Polish: Plac Tadeusza Kościuszki) until 1945 known as the Schinkel Square, (Note: German: Schinkelplatz) is an urban square in Szczecin, Poland. It is located in the neighbourhood of Śródmieście-Zachód, within the district of Śródmieście, at the intersection of Piastów Avenue, Krzywoustego Street, and Sikorskiego Street. It was constructed in 1878.

== History ==
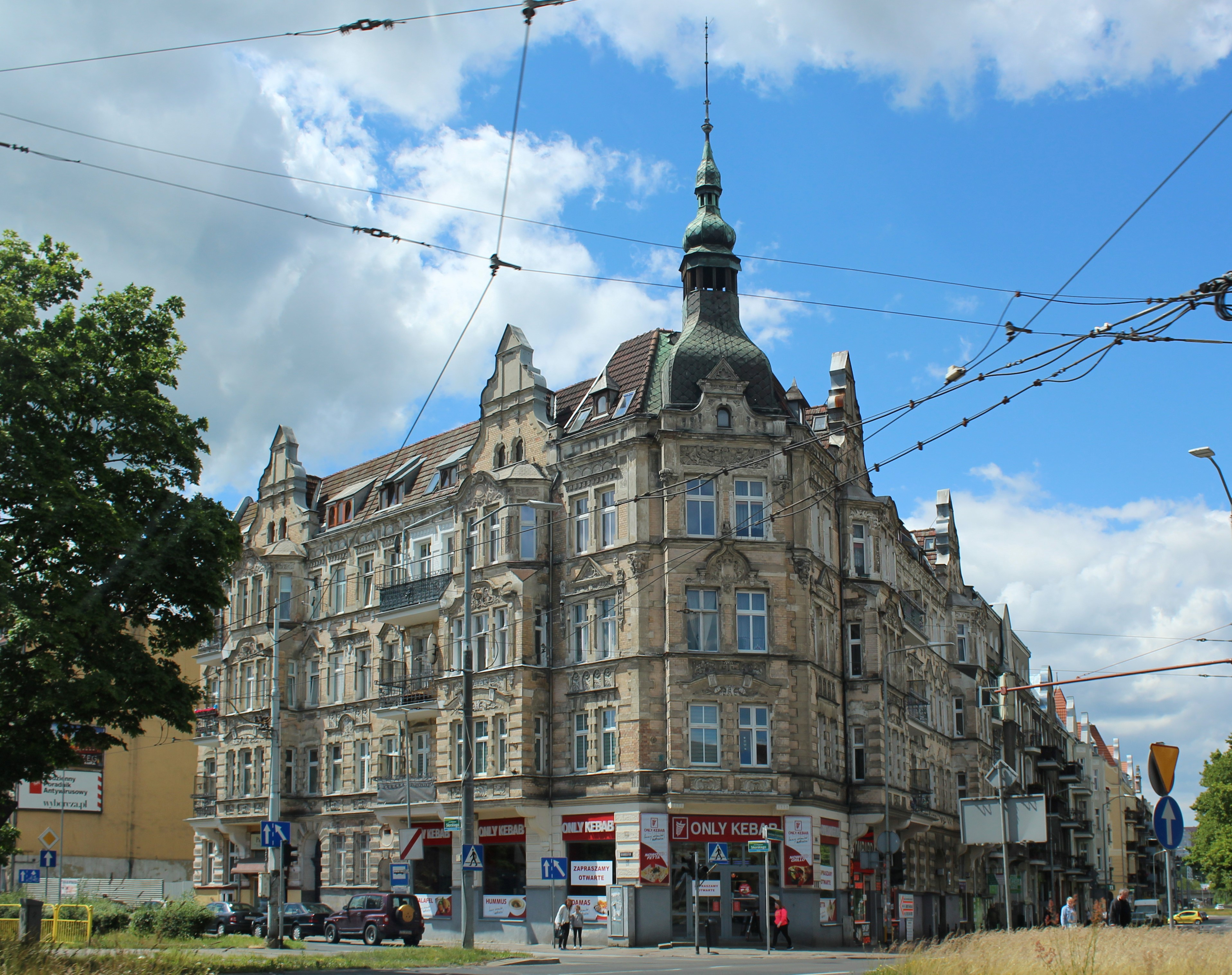
One of the historical tenements at the square in 2020.

The square was constructed between 1877 and 1878, as part of the development of the area. An intersection was established of what are today Piastów Avenue, Krzywoustego Street, and Sikorskiego Street, and around them were constructed lavishly ornamented tenements with electricity. It was named the Schinkel Square (German: Schinkelplatz), after Karl Friedrich Schinkel, a 19th-century architect.

Additionally, between Pistów Avenue and Sikorskiego Street was built a garden square, now known as the Janina Szczerska Square (Polish: Skwer im. Janiny Szczerskiej). It was named after Janina Szczerska, a 20th-century teacher, and founder of the Maria Skłodowska-Curie General Education High School no. 1 located nearby.

During World War II, the corners of the urban square were destroyed, and after the conflict, replaced with stores. In 1945, it was renamed to its current name, after Tadeusz Kościuszko, an 18th-century military leader who fought in the Kościuszko Uprising and the American Revolutionary War.

In 1972, the road intersection at the square was rebuilt, with traffic lights and an island in the centre being added.

Between 2009 and 2010, the Janina Szczerska Square was renovated.

== Characteristics ==
The square is located in the neighbourhood of Śródmieście-Zachód, within the district of Śródmieście, at the intersection of Piastów Avenue, Krzywoustego Street, and Sikorskiego Street.

Additionally, next to it is attached the garden square, known as the Janina Szczerska Square (Polish: Skwer im. Janiny Szczerskiej). It is located between Pistów Avenue and Sikorskiego Street, and Pułaskiego Street.
