= Tournay =

Tournay may refer to:

- Tournai, a municipality in the Belgian province of Hainaut, Wallonia
- Tournai-sur-Dive, a commune in the Orne department in northwestern France
- Tournay, Hautes-Pyrénées, a commune of the Hautes-Pyrénées département in southwestern France
- Tournay-sur-Odon, a commune of the Calvados département in northwestern France
- Tournay, Wallonia, a district of the municipality of Neufchâteau, Luxembourg Province, Belgium
