= Thorny Creek, West Virginia =

- Unincorporated community
- Location within West Virginia Location within the United States
- Coordinates: 38°15′10″N 80°02′13″W
- Country: United States
- State: West Virginia
- County: Pocahontas
- Elevation: 2,175 ft (663 m)
- Time zone: UTC-5 (Eastern (EST))
  - Summer (DST): UTC-4 (EDT)
- Area codes: 304 & 681
- GNIS feature ID: 1558396

Thorny Creek is an unincorporated community in Pocahontas County, West Virginia, United States. Thorny Creek is located on the Greenbrier River, 3.5 miles (5.6 km) northeast of Marlinton.

Thorny Creek is also home to the Thorny Creek Mountain Summit. The mountain stands at about 3,366 feet above sea level.
