= Thorney Island =

Thorney Island may refer to:

- Thorney Island (Westminster), a former eyot in the River Thames
- Thorney Island (West Sussex), an island in Chichester Harbour
