= New Town, Szczecin =

New Town
- Administrative neighbourhood
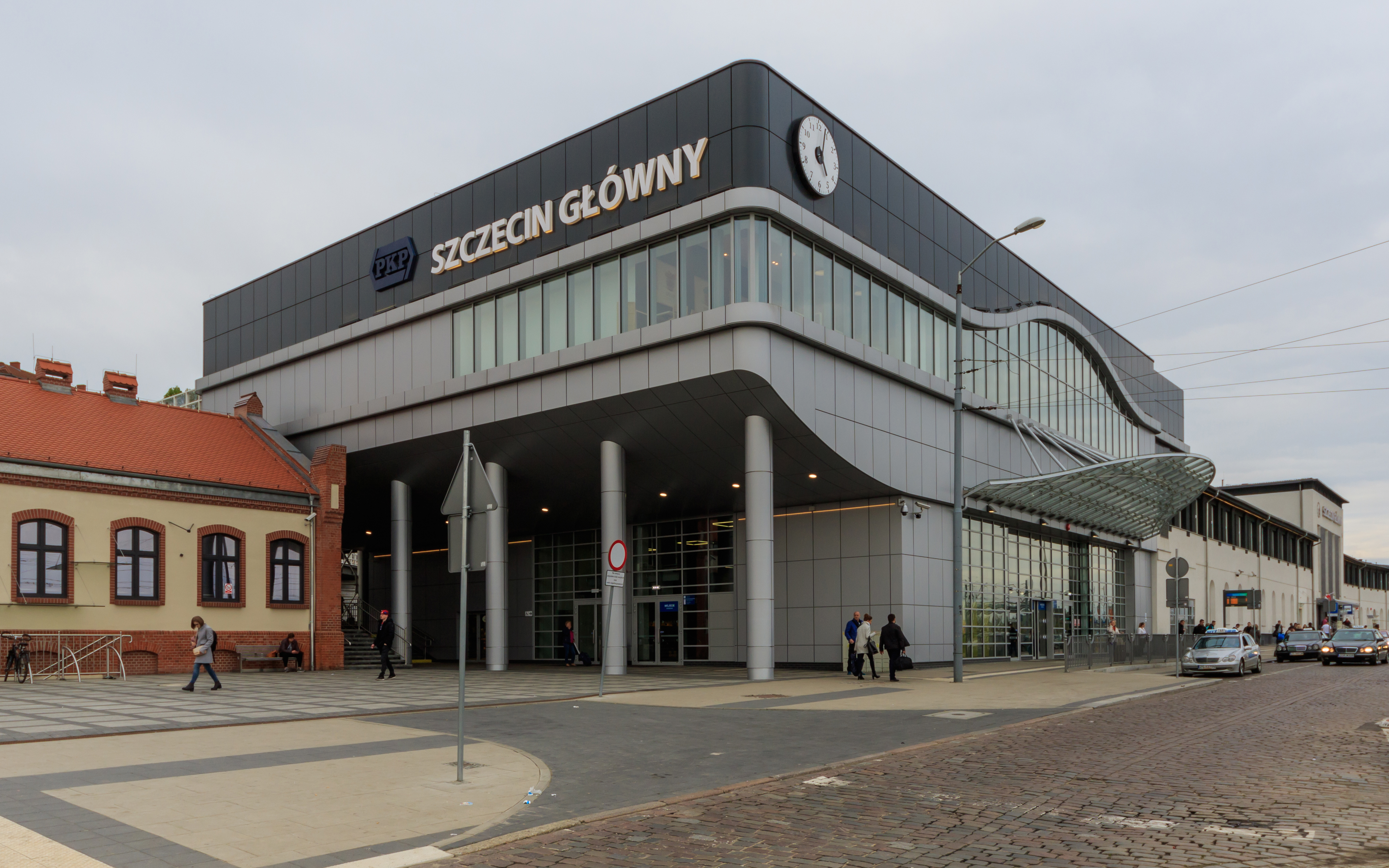
- Szczecin Główny Railway Station

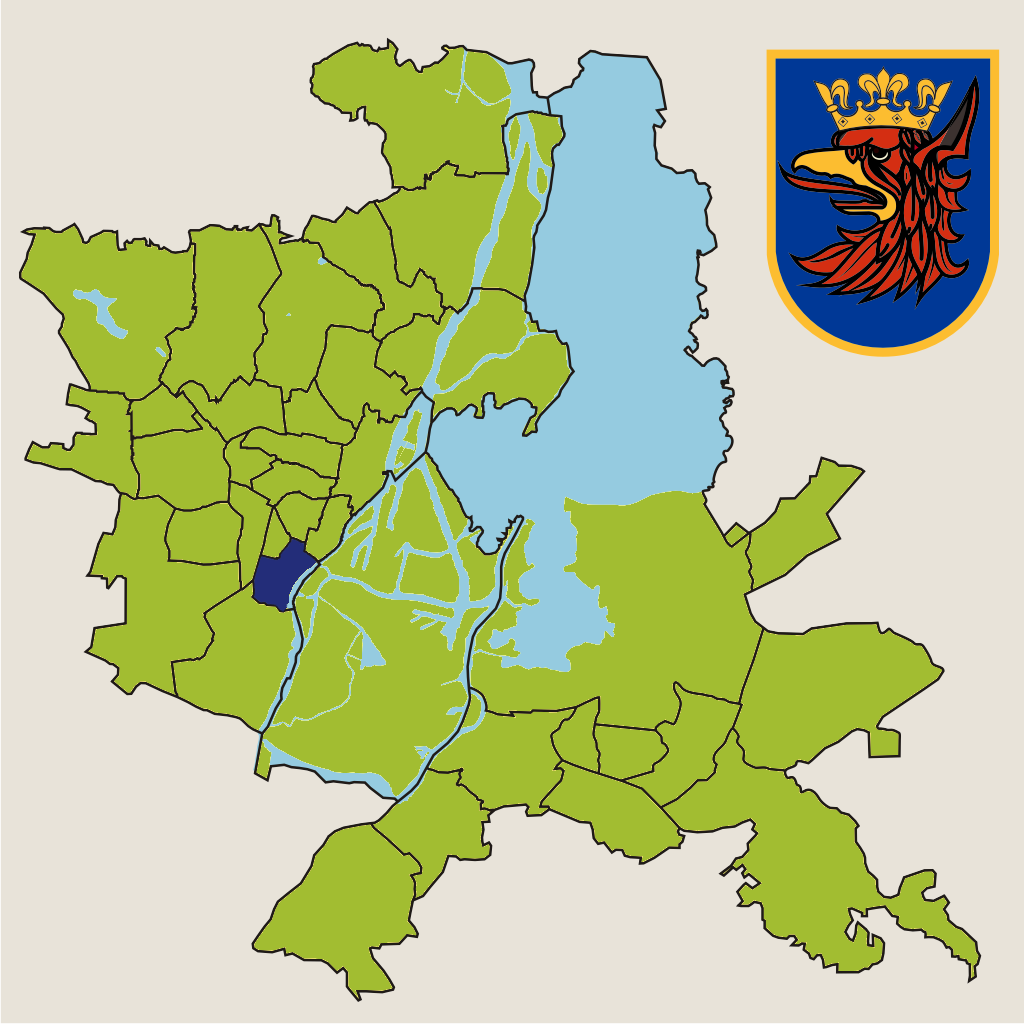
- Location of Nowe Miasto within Szczecin
- Coordinates: 53°25′07″N 14°32′59″E
- Country: Poland
- Voivodeship: West Pomeranian
- City and county: Szczecin

Population (2011)
  - Total: 8,092
- Time zone: UTC+1 (CET)
  - Summer (DST): UTC+2 (CEST)
- Area code: +48 91
- Car plates: ZS

New Town (Polish: Nowe Miasto; German: Neustadt) is an administrative neighbourhood of the city of Szczecin, Poland, situated on the left bank of Oder river, in Śródmieście district. It borders Turzyn to the west, Śródmieście-Zachód, Centrum and Stare Miasto to the north, Międzyodrze-Wyspa Pucka to the east, and Pomorzany to the south. As of January 2011 it had a population of 8092.
