= Szczecin University of Technology =

Polish university

Coordinates: 53°25′29″N 14°32′07″E

Szczecin University of Technology (Polish: Politechnika Szczecińska) is a university in Szczecin, Poland.

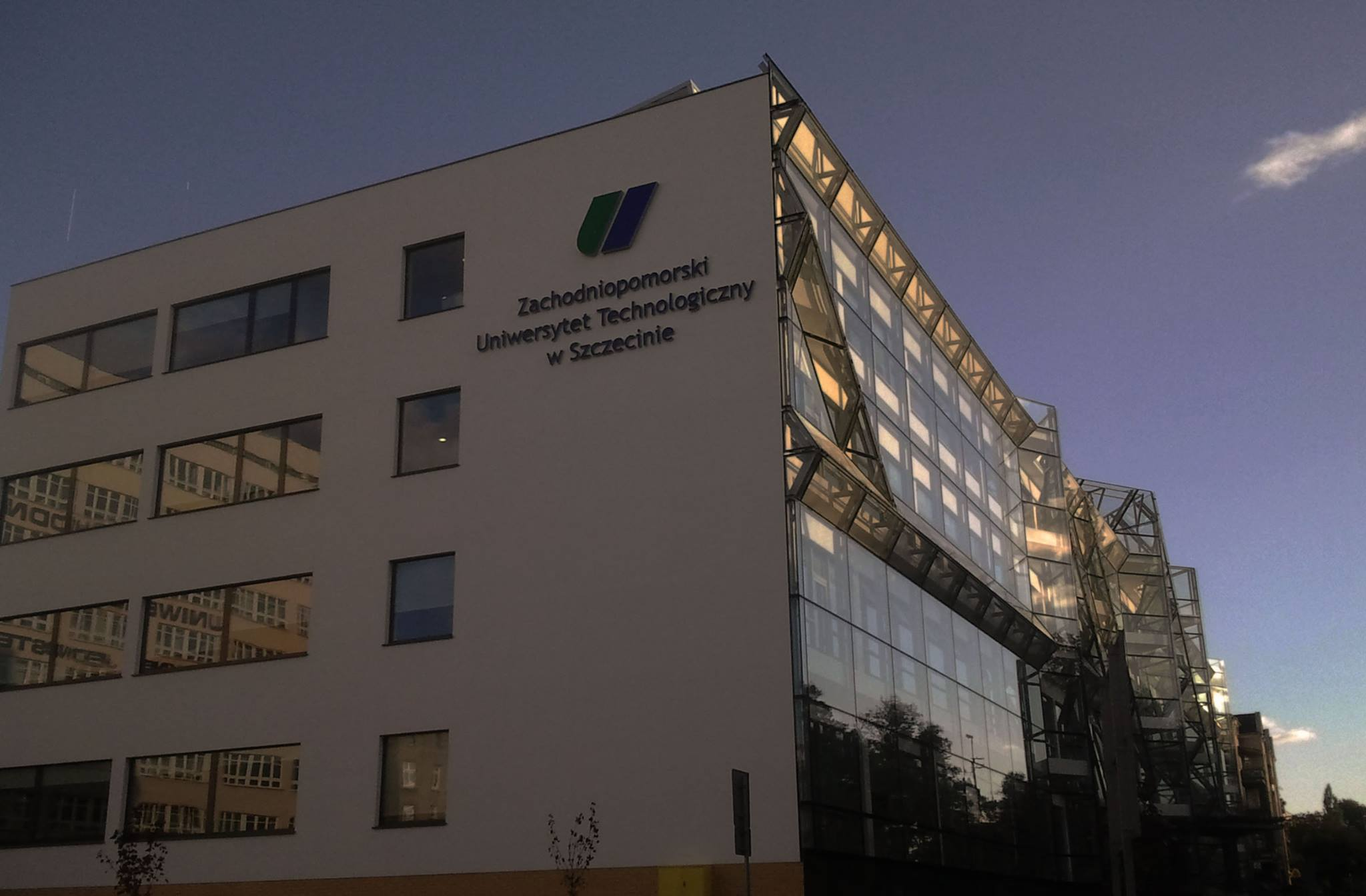
Nanotechnology

== History ==
Szczecin University of Technology was established on 1 December 1946 as School of Engineering in Szczecin (Szkoła Inżynierska w Szczecinie). Initially it included three faculties - the Faculty of Electrical Engineering (Wydział Elektryczny), the Faculty of Civil Engineering (Wydział Inżynierii Lądowej), and the Faculty of Mechanical Engineering (Wydział Mechaniczny). In the following academic year, it was expanded with the opening of the Faculty of Chemical Engineering (Wydział Chemiczny).

On 1 September 1955 the university took over the departments of the liquidated School of Economics in Szczecin (Szkoła Ekonomiczna w Szczecinie) and established the Faculty of Engineering and Economics of Transport (Wydział Inżynieryjno-Ekonomiczny Transportu). On 3 September 1955 it was transformed into the Technical University of Szczecin.

In 1985, University of Szczecin took over the Faculty of Engineering and Economics of Transport.

The university ceased to exist on 1 January 2009 when it fused with the University of Agriculture in Szczecin, creating the West Pomeranian University of Technology.

== Organization of former University ==
=== Faculties ===
- Faculty of Chemical Engineering (Polish: Wydział Technologii i Inżynierii Chemicznej)
- Faculty of Civil Engineering and Architecture (Polish: Wydział Budownictwa i Architektury)
- Faculty of Computer Science and Information Technology (Polish: Wydział Informatyki)
- Faculty of Electrical Engineering (Polish: Wydział Elektryczny)
- Faculty of Maritime Technology (Polish: Wydział Techniki Morskiej)
- Faculty of Mechanical Engineering (Polish: Wydział Mechaniczny)

== See also ==
- West Pomeranian University of Technology
