= West Pomeranian University of Technology =

Technical university in Szczecin, Poland

Coordinates: 53°25′28″N 14°32′7″E

West Pomeranian University of Technology, Szczecin
- Zachodniopomorski Uniwersytet Technologiczny w Szczecinie (ZUT)
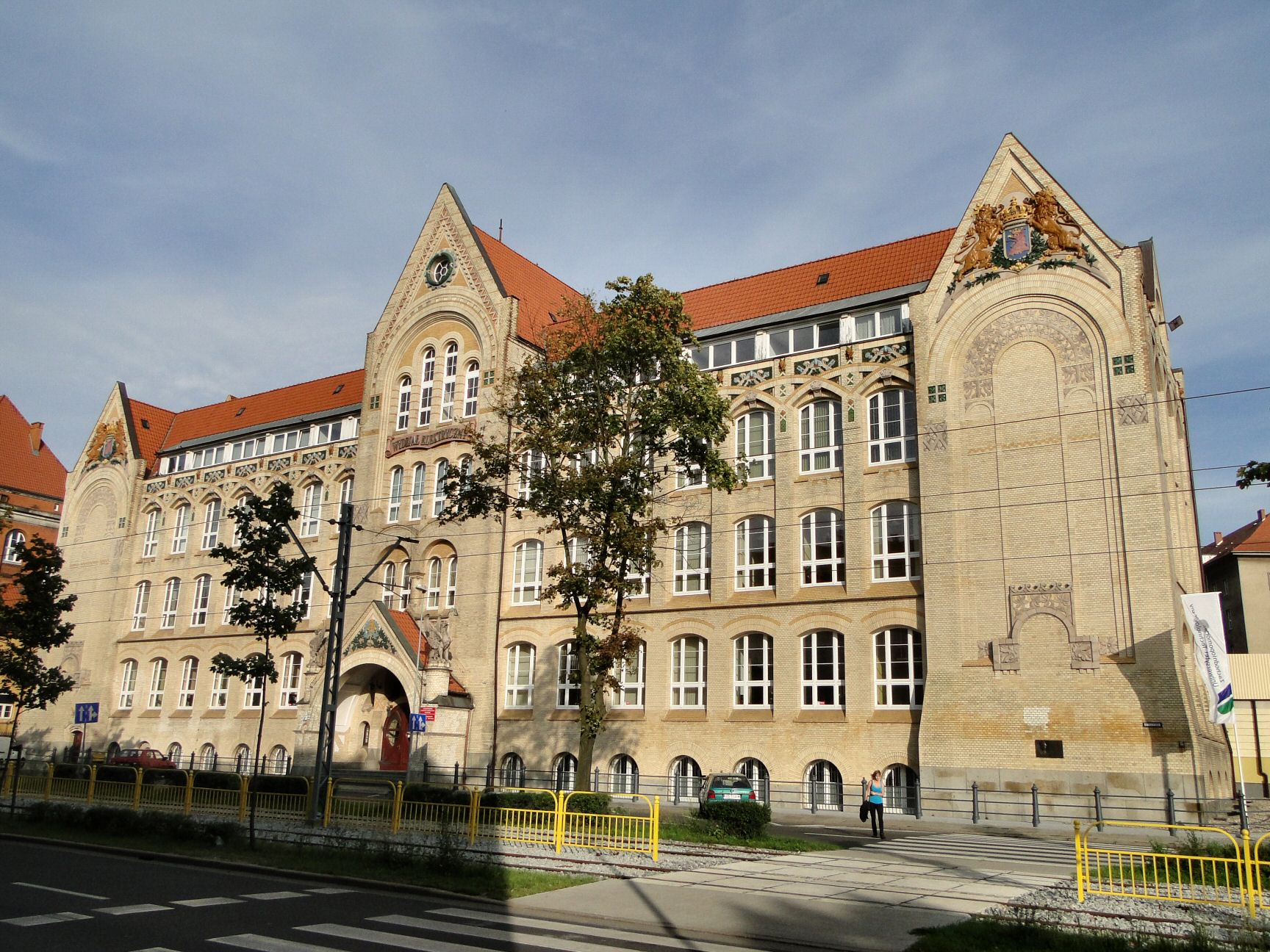
- Type: Public
- Established: 1 January 2009
- Rector: dr hab. Jacek Wróbel
- Students: 5,782 (12.2023)
- Location: al. Piastów 17, 70-310 Szczecin, Szczecin, Poland
- Campus: Urban
- Colors: green-blue
- Nickname: ZUT
- Website: www.zut.edu.pl

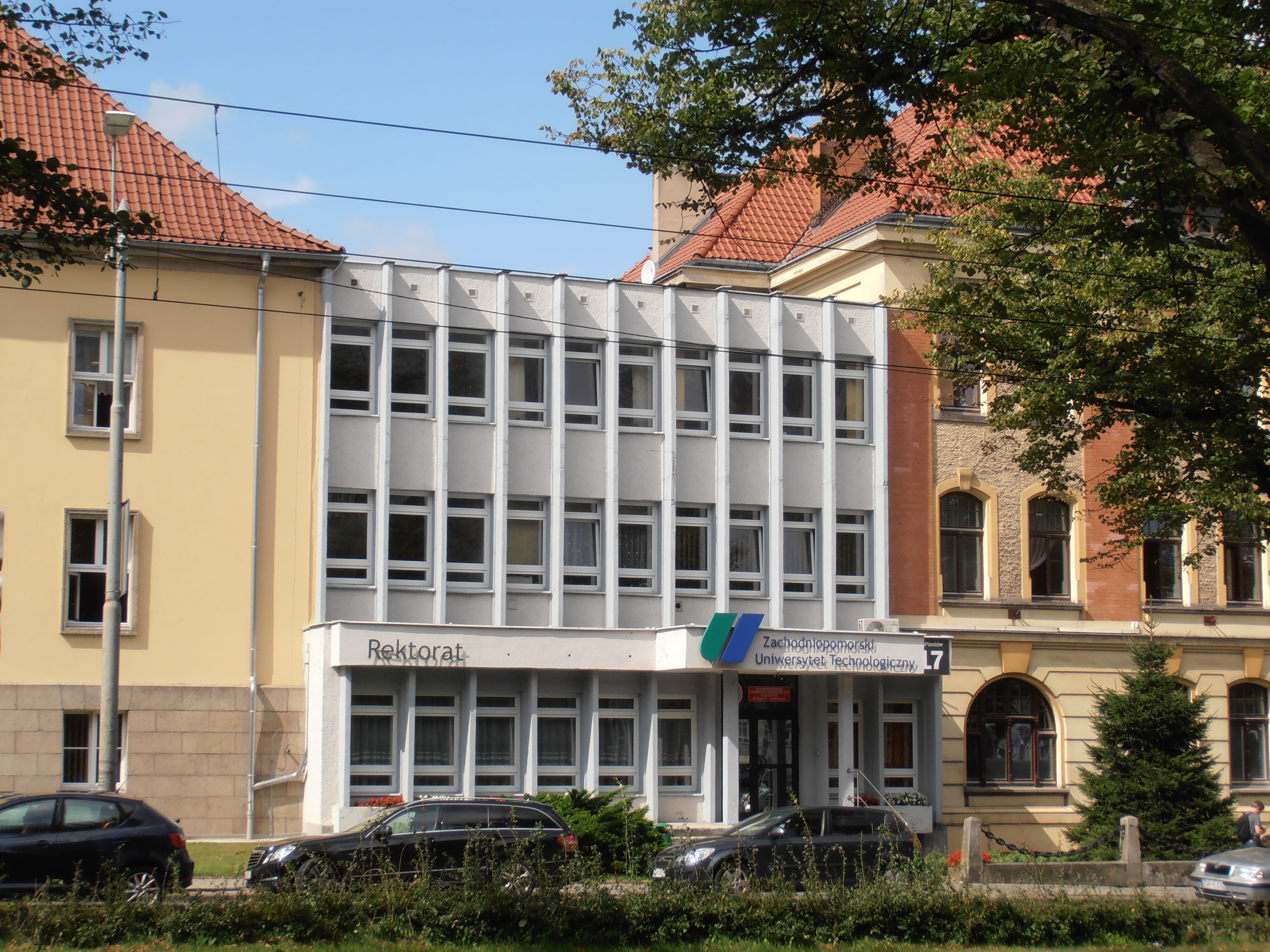
Rector's office

West Pomeranian University of Technology, Szczecin (Polish: Zachodniopomorski Uniwersytet Technologiczny w Szczecinie, ZUT) is a technical university in Szczecin, Poland. The university was established on January 1, 2009 in Szczecin, from the merger of the Agricultural University of Szczecin and the Szczecin University of Technology.

The first rector of the university was Professor Włodzimierz Kiernożycki. The university has 10 faculties with 47 fields of study, 2,300 employees and around 15,000 students.

The university operates in technology, economics, biology, chemistry, mathematics, and agricultural sciences.

== History ==
The university was established on 1 January 2009. It had formerly existed as two academies: the Szczecin University of Technology (Polish: Politechnika Szczecińska) and the University of Agriculture in Szczecin (Polish: Akademia Rolnicza w Szczecinie).

== Faculties ==
# Faculty of Civil Engineering and Architecture (Wydział Budownictwa i Architektury), from Szczecin University of Technology:

- Architecture and urban planning
- Civil Engineering
- Civil Engineering - European Engineer
- Environmental Engineering
- Design

# Faculty of Computer Science and Information Technology (Wydział Informatyki), from Szczecin University of Technology:

- Information Technology
- Digital Engineering

# Faculty of Electrical Engineering (Wydział Elektryczny), from Szczecin University of Technology:

- Automation and Robotics
- Electronics and telecommunication
- Electrotechnics
- ICT

# Faculty of Mechanical Engineering and Mechatronics (Wydział Inżynierii Mechanicznej i Mechatroniki), from Szczecin University of Technology:

- Energetics
- Material Engineering
- Mechanical engineering
- Mechatronics
- Transport
- Production Engineering and Management

# Faculty of Chemical Engineering (Wydział Technologii i Inżynierii Chemicznej), from Szczecin University of Technology:

- Chemistry
- Chemical and Process Engineering
- Nanotechnology
- Environmental Protection
- Chemical Technology
- Commodity Science

# Faculty of Maritime Technology (Wydział Techniki Morskiej), from Szczecin University of Technology:

- Security Engineering
- Maritime Engineering
- Transport
- Construction of Yachts
- Refrigeration and Air Conditioning

# Faculty of Biotechnology and Animal Husbandry (Wydział Biotechnologii i Hodowli Zwierząt), from University of Agriculture in Szczecin:

- Biology
- Biotechnology
- Zootechny
- Bioinformatics - inter-directional studies

# Faculty of Environmental Management and Agriculture (Wydział Kształtowania Środowiska i Rolnictwa), from University of Agriculture in Szczecin:

- Landscape architecture
- Waste Management and Reclamation of Degraded Areas
- Spatial Economy
- Environmental Protection
- Gardening
- Agriculture
- Agricultural and Forestry Technology

# Faculty of Food Sciences and Fisheries (Wydział Nauk o Żywności i Rybactwa), from University of Agriculture in Szczecin:

- Applied Microbiology
- Fishing Science
- Food Technology and human Nutrition
- Commodity Science
- Food and Water Environment Analysis - inter-directional studies
- Food and Water Environment Engineering - inter-directional studies
- Safety and quality of food Management

# Faculty of Economics (Wydział Ekonomiczny), from University of Agriculture in Szczecin:

- Economy
- Management

== See also ==
- Szczecin University of Technology
