= Świerczewo, Szczecin =

Neighbourhood of Szczecin, Poland

Świerczewo
- Administrative neighbourhood
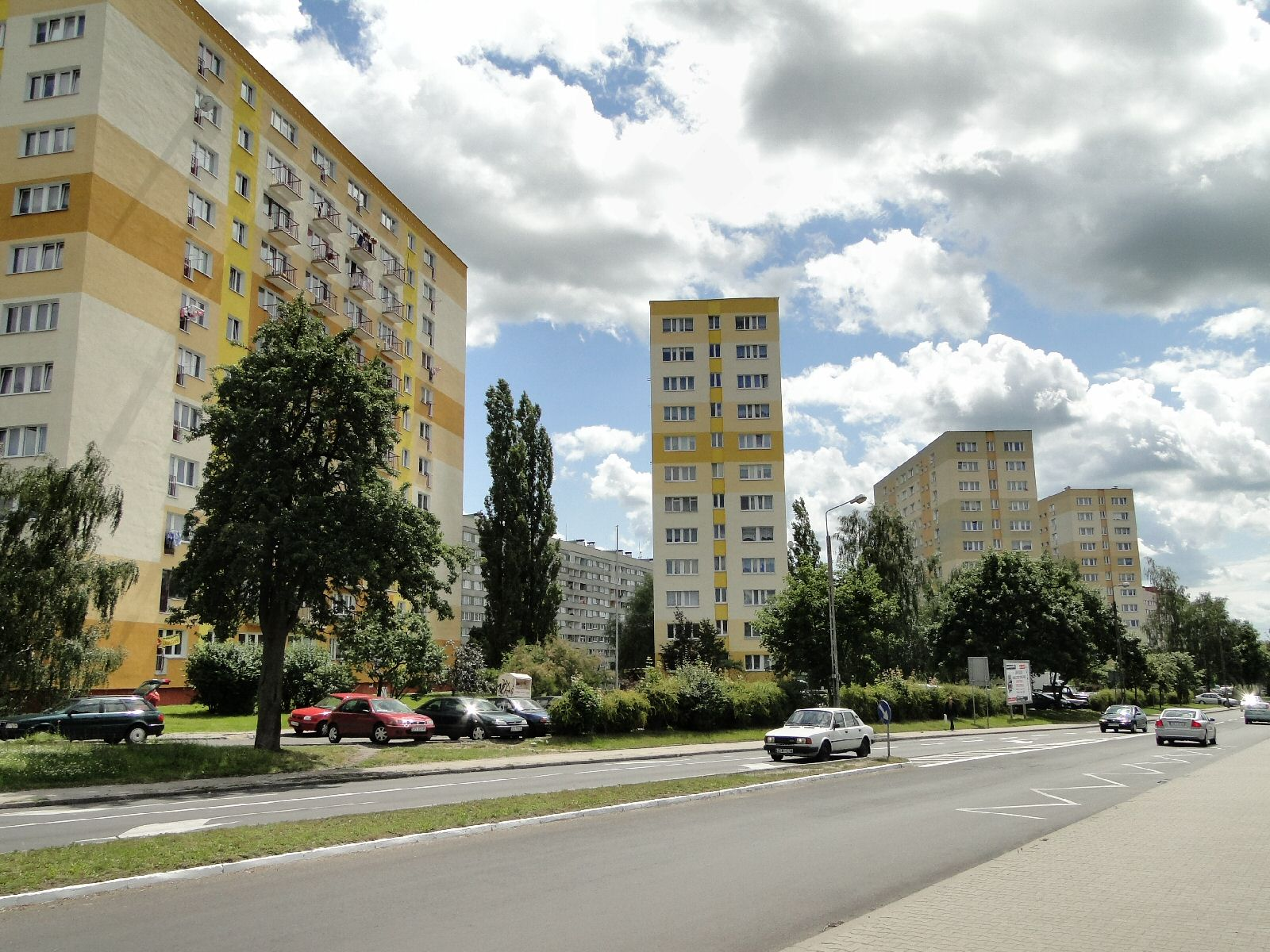
- The appartment buildings on Ku Słońcu Street in Świerczewo.

- The location of Świerczewo within Szczecin.
- Coordinates: 53°26′48.1″N 14°30′56.8″E
- Country: Poland
- Voivodeship: West Pomeranian
- City and county: Szczecin
- District: West
- Seat: 11 Jodłowa Street

Area
  - Total: 2.44 km^{2} (0.94 sq mi)

Population (2025)
  - Total: 13,986
  - Density: 5,730/km^{2} (14,800/sq mi)
- Time zone: UTC+1 (CET)
  - Summer (DST): UTC+2 (CEST)
- Area code: +48 91
- Car plates: ZS

Świerczewo (Polish: [ɕfjɛrˈt͡ʂɛ.vɔ]; German until 1947: Schwarzow [ˈʃvar.tsoː]) is an administrative neighbourhood forming a subdivision of the West district in the city of Szczecin, Poland. It is a residential area consisting of mid- and high-rise apartment buildings in several housing estates. The neighbourhood has an area of 2.44 km^{2} (0.94 sq mi), and in 2025, it had a population of 13,986 people. Świerczewo was founded in the 14th century as a farming community. Its population drasticly increased in the early 20th century, with the development of a low-rise single-family suburb, and was incorporated into Szczecin in 1911. The area was later fatherly expanded with development of a few housing estates of apartment buildings later throughout the century, including in the 1930s, the 1980s, and the 1990s. The neighbourhood features the historic St. Catherine Church, a former Gothic Lutheran temple, dating to the 15th century, prior to 1424.

== Toponomy ==
The name Świerczewo comes from Polish word świerk, meaning "spruce", with the combination with -ewo, a typical Polish noun building suffix in the creation of the locality names. With the settlement remaining under German-speaking administration for several centuries, it has been Germanised as Schwarzow, with the Polish name being officially restored in 1947.

== History ==
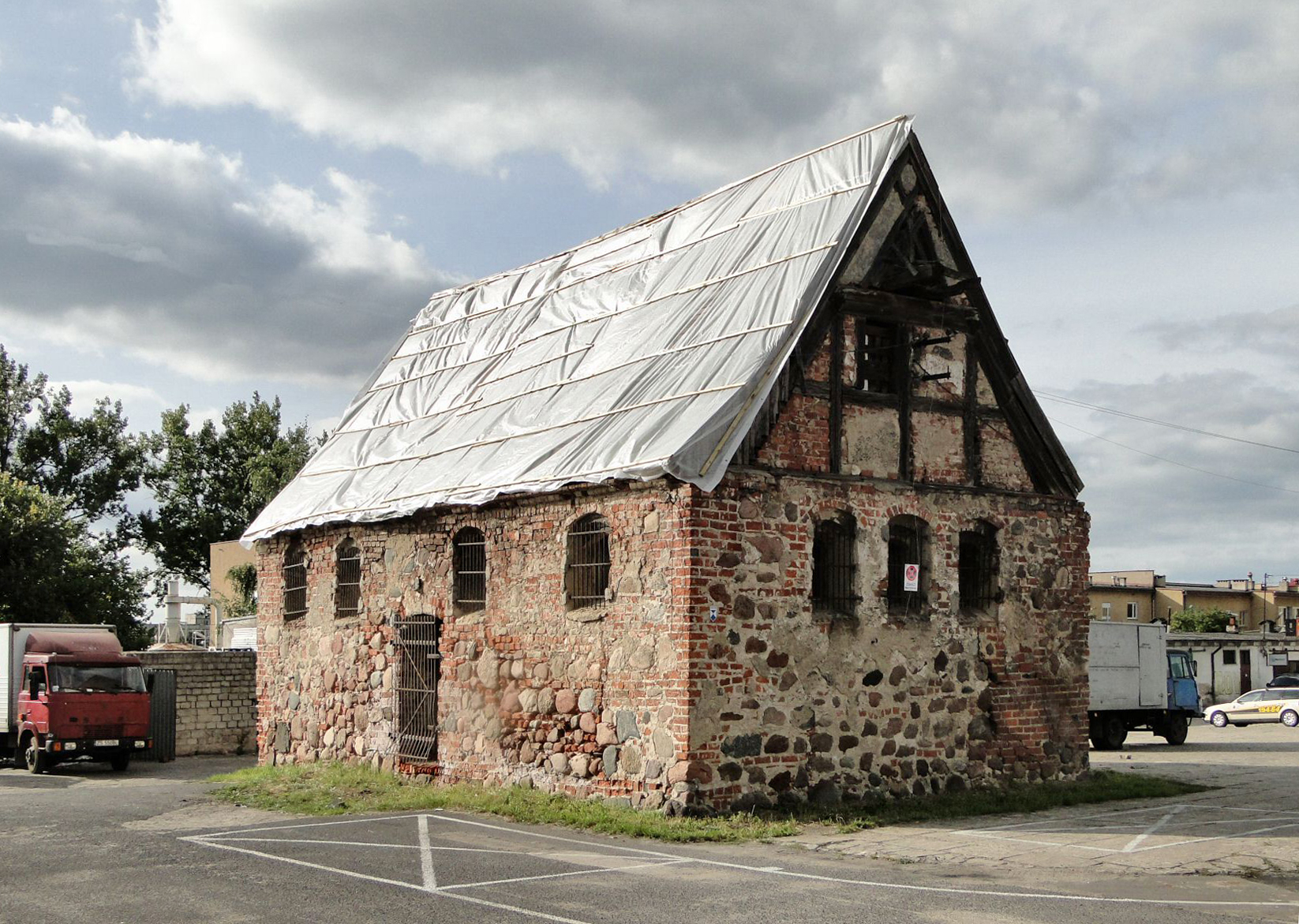
The St. Catherine Church, built prior to 1424.

Świerczewo (then known as Schwarzow), was settled in the 14th century, as a farming community. The village was located within the southern portion of the modern neighbourhood. The St. Catherine Church was constructed within the village with a Gothic stone structe, with its oldest records dating to 1424. It originally belonged to the Roman Catholic denomiantion, which was later changed to Lutheranism in the 16th century during the Protestant Reformation. The building was destroyed and rebuilt twice in the 17th century and was heavily damaged during the Napoleonic Wars in the 19th century, being used as a lazaretto since then. In 1918, it was again adopted to serve as a church, which it did until the end of the Second World War.

In 1898, the Szczecin Turzyn railway station, originally known as Torney, and later Stettin-Torney, was opened at the corner of the curren Bohaterów Warszawy and Dwudziestego Szóstego Kwietnia Streets, near the villages of Świerczewo and Turzyn. On 4 October 1946, two passenger trains collided at the station, killing 7 people, and leaving 15 injured. Currently, it is located within the boundaries of the neighbourhood of Turzyn.

In 1904, the tracks of the tram network of the city of Szczecin were constructed alongside Ku Słońcu Street, ending at the eastern gate of the Central Cemetery. It was further extended in 1927 to the intersection of Ku Słońcu, Derdowskiego, and Europejska Streets. Świerczewo was incorporated into Szczecin in 1911.

At the turn of the 20th century, a housing estate with the single-family housing was developed in Świerczewo. The area was incorporated into the city in 1911. During the interwar period of the 20th century, the housing estate of Osiedle Kaliny, consisting of mid-rise apartment buildings, was developed in the area between the current Witkiewicza, Santocka, Dwudziestego Szóstego Kwietnia, and Derdowskiego Streets. Between 1935 and 1936, the housing estate of the Postal Estate (Polish: Osiedle Pocztowe; German: Postsiedlung Sucksdorf) was also developed between the current Ku Słońcu, Miarki, Pięknej, and Sucharskiego Streets, with the construction of the mid-rise apartment buildings. Prior to 1945, it had a population of around five thousand people. Świerczewo was further developed with addition of more mid-rise apartment buildings in the 1970s and 1980s. In the 1970s, the housing estate, known as the Friendship Estate (Polish: Osiedle Przyjaźni), was developed between Dwudziestego Szóstego Kwietnia Street, Santocka Street, Witkiewicza Street, and the railway tracks.

In 1930, the Kołobrzeg Barrack, a complex of military barracks, was constructed on the current Ku Słońcu Street, housing two battalions of the 2nd Artillery Regiment of the Reich Defence Army. Since 1994, they house the 12th Command Battalion of the 12th Mechanised Division, a unit of the Polish Land Forces.

On 26 April 1945, during the Second World War, the area was captured by the 2nd Shock Army of the 2nd Belorussian Front, a part of the Red Army of the Soviet Union. The city was placed under the Polish administration on 5 July 1945, while its suburbs, including Świerczewo, were placed under the Soviet military occupation. It was returned under the Polish control on 4 October 1945, being incorporated back into the city. The German population left and was forced out from the city, and was replaced by Polish settlers.

From 1955 to 1976, the neighbourhood of Świerczewo was one of the eight administrative subdivisions of the Pogodno district. In 1960, it had a population of 3,714 people. On 28 November 1990, the neighbourhood of Świerczewo was established as one of the administrative subdivisions of the West district, being governed by an elected council.

In 1986, the St. John Bosco Church was built at 1 Św. Jana Bosko Street, becoming a seat of Roman Catholic parish.

In 1992, second building of the Faculty of Electrical Engineering was opened at 10 Dwudziestego Szóstego Kwietnia Street. It originally belonged to the Szczecin University of Technology, and, since 2009, is part of the West Pomeranian University of Technology.

In 2019, the American football team Armada Szczecin was founded, with its headquarters placed at the football pitch on 69 Witkiewicza Street. It competed in the American Football League, and later in the Polish Football League, and was disestablished in 2021.

== Characteristics ==
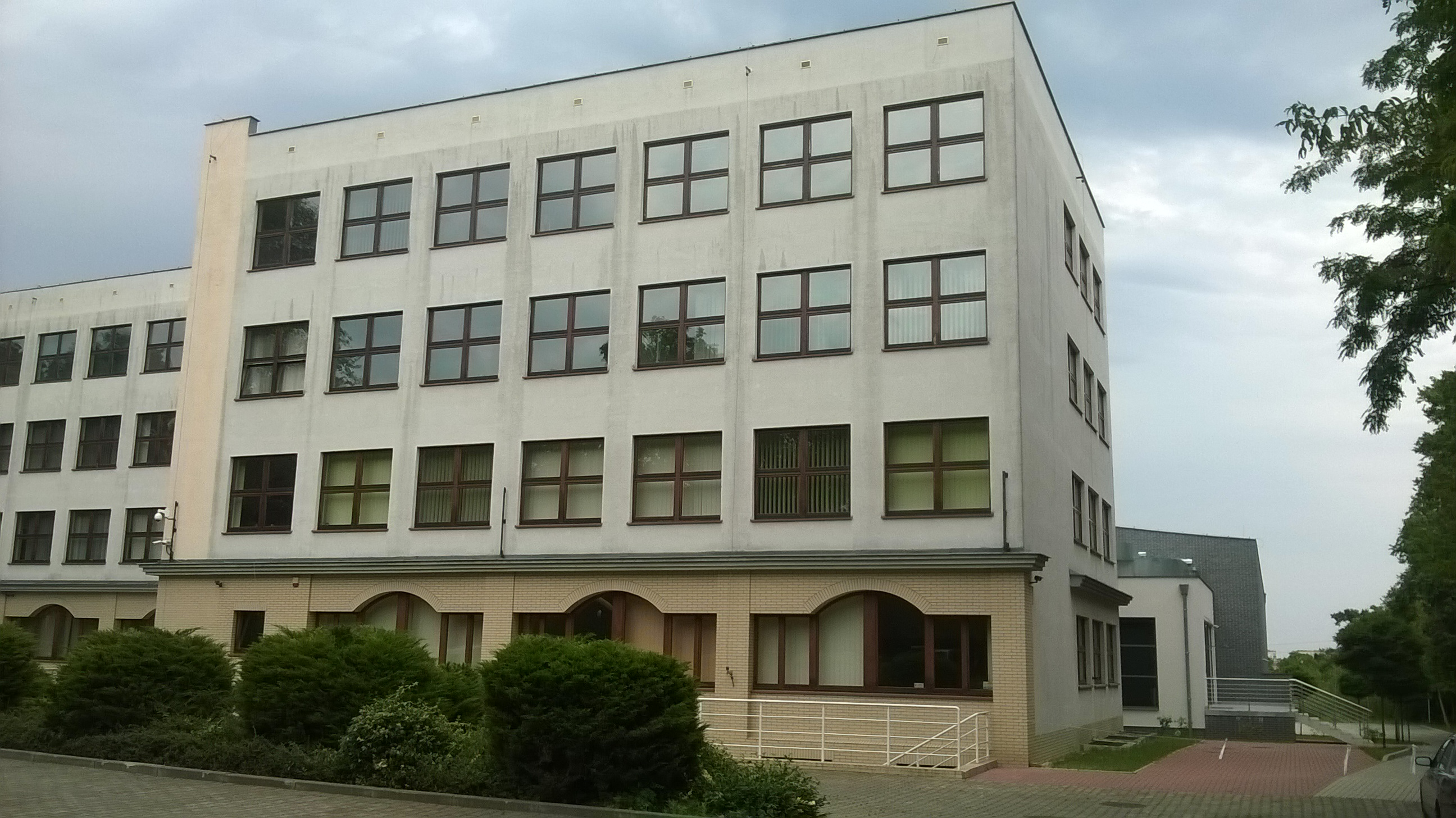
The building of the Faculty of Engineering of the West Pomeranian University of Technology.

Świerczewo is a residential area with mid-rise housing, consisting of apartment buildings. It includes the housing estates of the Friendship Estate, the Postal Estate, and Osiedle Kaliny. The area includes the St. John Bosco Church, located at 1 Św. Jana Bosko Street, which forms a seat of a Roman Catholic parish, as well as the historic St. Catherine Church, a former Gothic Lutheran temple, dating to the 15th century, prior to 1424. Świerczewo also features one of two buildings of the Faculty of Engineering of the West Pomeranian University of Technology, placed at 10 Dwudziestego Szóstego Kwietnia Street. Additionally, the Koszalin Baracks, which house the 12th Command Battalion of the 12th Mechanised Division, a unit of the Polish Land Forces, are located on Ku Słońcu Street. The neighbourhood is connected to the municipal tram network with tracks placed alongside Ku Słońcu Street.

== Demographics ==
Historical population
Year	2008	2009	2010	2011	2012	2013	2014	2015	2016	2017	2018	2019	2020	2021	2022	2023	2024	2025
Pop.	17,416	17,248	16,888	16,669	16,715	16,528	16,259	16,120	15,866	15,716	15,477	15,259	15,265	14,987	14,712	14,479	14,262	13,986
±%	—	−1.0%	−2.1%	−1.3%	+0.3%	−1.1%	−1.6%	−0.9%	−1.6%	−0.9%	−1.5%	−1.4%	+0.0%	−1.8%	−1.8%	−1.6%	−1.5%	−1.9%

== Government and boundaries ==
Świerczewo is one of the nine administrative neighbourhoods forming the subdivisions of the West district in the city of Szczecin, Poland. It is governed by a locally elected neighbourhood council with 15 members, and a board of administrators with 5 members, the latter chosen internally. Its seat is located at 11 Jodłowa Street. It borders the neighbourhoods of Pogodno to the north, Turzyn to the east, and Gumieńce to the southwest. Its boundaries are approximately determined by Witkiewicza Street, tracks of the railway line no. 406, Ku Słońcu Street, and Derdowskiego Street. Świerczewo has a total area of 2.44 km^{2} (0.94 sq mi).
