= Gumieńce =

Neighbourhood of Szczecin, Poland

- Administrative neighbourhood
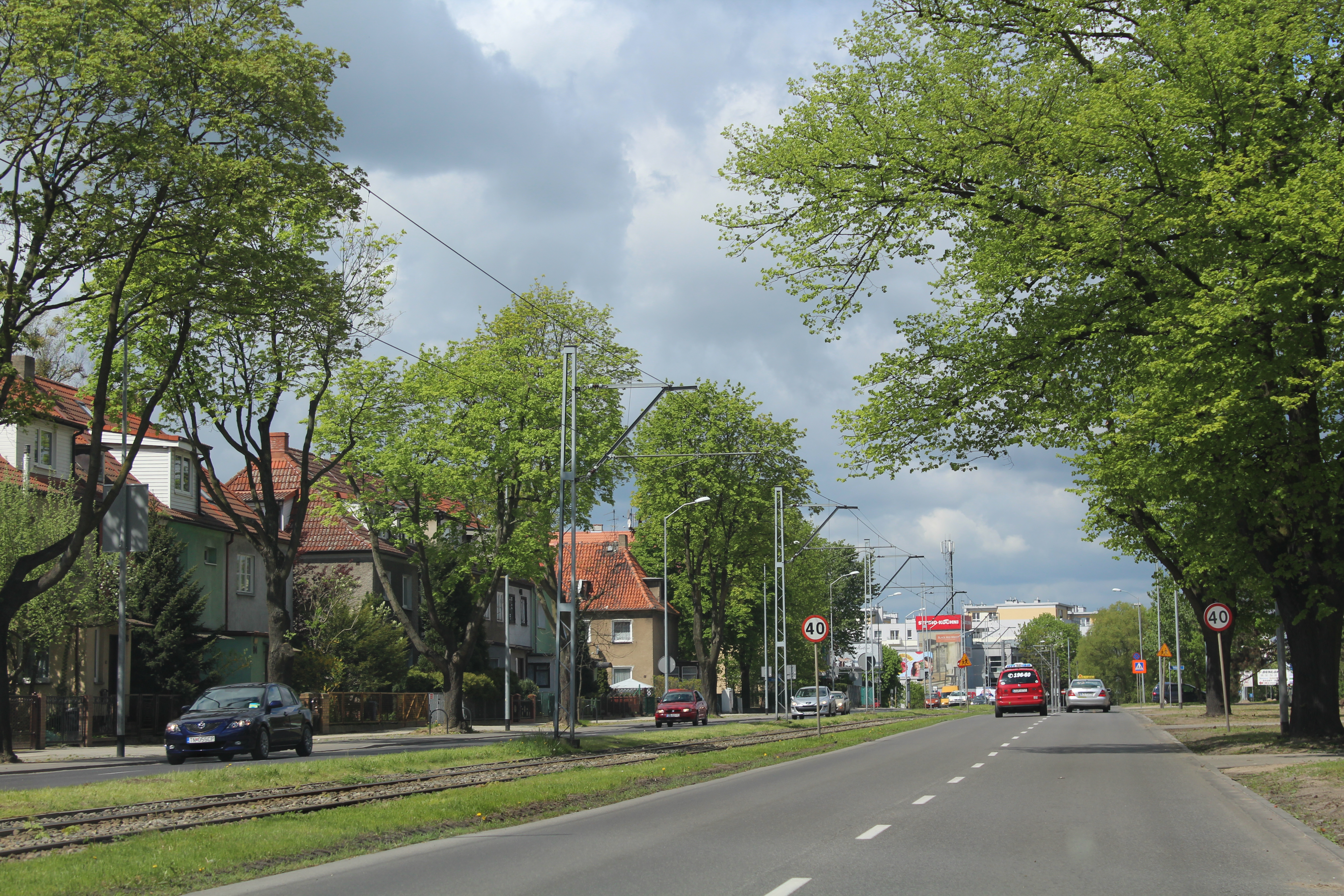
- The houses on Ku Słońcu Street in Gumieńce.

- Location of Gumieńce within Szczecin.
- Coordinates: 53°24′47.88″N 14°29′52.08″E
- Country: Poland
- Voivodeship: West Pomeranian
- City and county: Szczecin
- District: West
- Seat: 76 Ku Słońcu Street

Area
  - Total: 10.42 km^{2} (4.02 sq mi)

Population (2025)
  - Total: 23,031
  - Density: 2,210/km^{2} (5,725/sq mi)
- Time zone: UTC+1 (CET)
  - Summer (DST): UTC+2 (CEST)
- Area code: +48 91
- Car plates: ZS

Gumieńce (Polish: [ɡuˈmjɛɲ.t͡sɛ]; German until 1945: Scheune [ˈʃɔʏ̯.nə]; Latin: Orreum [ˈor.re.um]) is an administrative neighbourhood forming a subdivision of the West district in the city of Szczecin, Poland. It is predominantly a low-rise residential area with detached and semi-detached houses. It also includes housing estates with apartment buildings. Gumieńce has an area of 10.4 km^{2} (4.02 sq mi), and in 2025, was inhabited by 23,031 people, making it the most populous neighbourhood in the city. It includes the Central Cemetery, which had over 300,000 burials, and with an area of 172.33 ha (425.84 acres), is the largest cemetery in Poland, the third largest in Europe, and one of the largest in the world. It also features the Our Lady of Rosary Church, dating to the 15th century.

The first signs of human presence in the area of the modern Gumieńce date to the Neolithic period, and the area included settlements of the Hallstatt culture and Lusatian culture during the late Bronze Age and the early Iron Age. The oldest records of the village Gumieńce date to 1229, when it was a small farming community. The area began rapidly developing in the second half of the 19th century, with the construction of the few housing estates, as well as large brickworks and one of the largest sugar refineries in the region. In 1901, one of the largest cemeteries in Europe, now known as the Central Cemetery, was opened in its southeastern portion. Gumieńce was incorporated into the city in 1939.

== Toponymy ==
The name of Gumieńce comes from Polish term gumno, meaning the threshing floor, as it was used in construction of the first structures in the area, due to their placement of a marshy ground. The oldest known record of the name, then spelt Gumence, comes from 1229. Its German and Latin names, Scheune and Orreum, respectively, were calques of the Polish name. The former was used until 1945.

== History ==
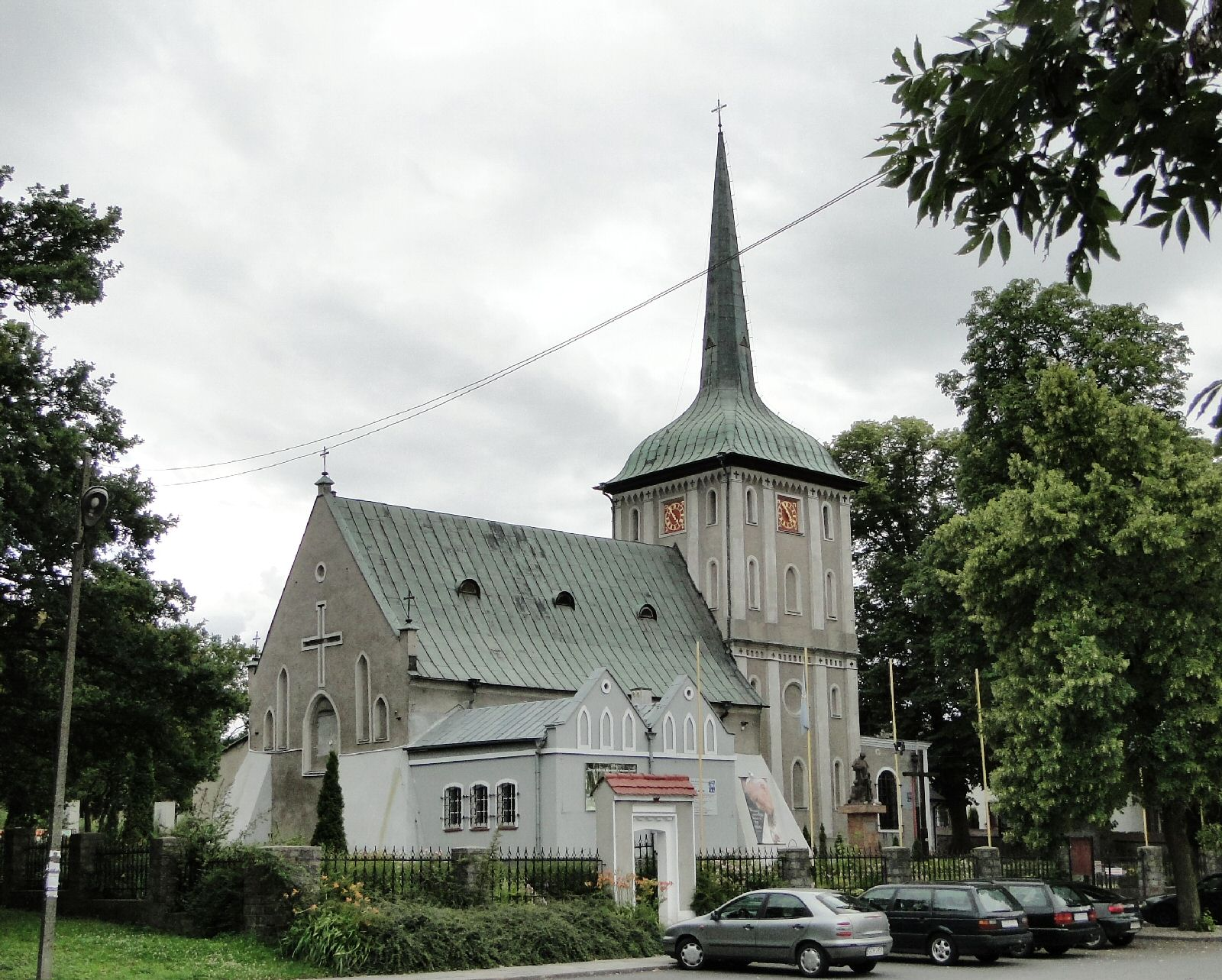
The Our Lady of Rosary Church, dating to the 15th century.

The oldest known signs of human presence in the area of the modern Gumieńce date to the Neolithic period. Later, a large settlement of the Hallstatt culture (between 1200 and 450 BCE), was present in the area. A small settlement, dating back to the 4th century BCE, was also present within modern Gumieńce, with a cemetery with 60 urn of the Lusatian culture (between 1200 and 500 BCE), as well as a weaver's tool and pieces of ceramics, being discovered. In the Early Middle Ages, three settlements were also present in the area of the modern neighbourhood. In addition, pieces of dishes, bones, and charcoal from the 11th to 12th centuries were discovered alongside the Jasna Woda stream. At its end, 12 silver coins buried there before 1039 were also found.

The oldest known mention of Gumieńce, then spelled as Gumence, comes from the 1229 documents issued by duke Barnim I, the ruler of the Duchy of Pomerania-Stettin, in which, he reaffirmed ownership of lands in the area to the Order of Saint John, which was previously granted by his father, Bogislaw II, and grandfather, Bogislaw I. Its name was also recorded in Latin as Orreum in a document from 1253. In German, the settlement was known as Scheune. It was a farming community, cultivating wheat and barley on a fertile soil of a marshland. By 1300, the Gumieńce Church, was present in the village, having a wooden structure, and belonging to the Roman Catholic parish of St. James the Apostle. In the 15th century, it was replaced with the current building, now known as the Our Lady of Rosary Church, located at the current 1 Lwowska Street. In the 13th century, the village was owned by the Bishopric of Cammin. In the year 1300, duke Barnim I, transferred the ownership of the village of Będargowo, together with its church, to Gumieńce, as well as half of the tithe payments of the village of Kamieniec. Additionally, other Roman Catholic institutions, such as the Premonstratensian monastery in Pudagla on the Usedom island, and the St. Otto Church in Szczecin, collected tributes from Gumieńce as well. In the 15th century, the village was a feudal property of knight families and townspeople. In 1659, during the siege of Szczecin in the Second Northern War, the village was occupied by the Brandenburgian troops, and survived the conflict without major destruction. By the 15th century, a small hamlet of Ostoja (German: Schadeleben) also funtioned next to Gumieńce. In the 17th century, Gumieńce was sparsely populated.

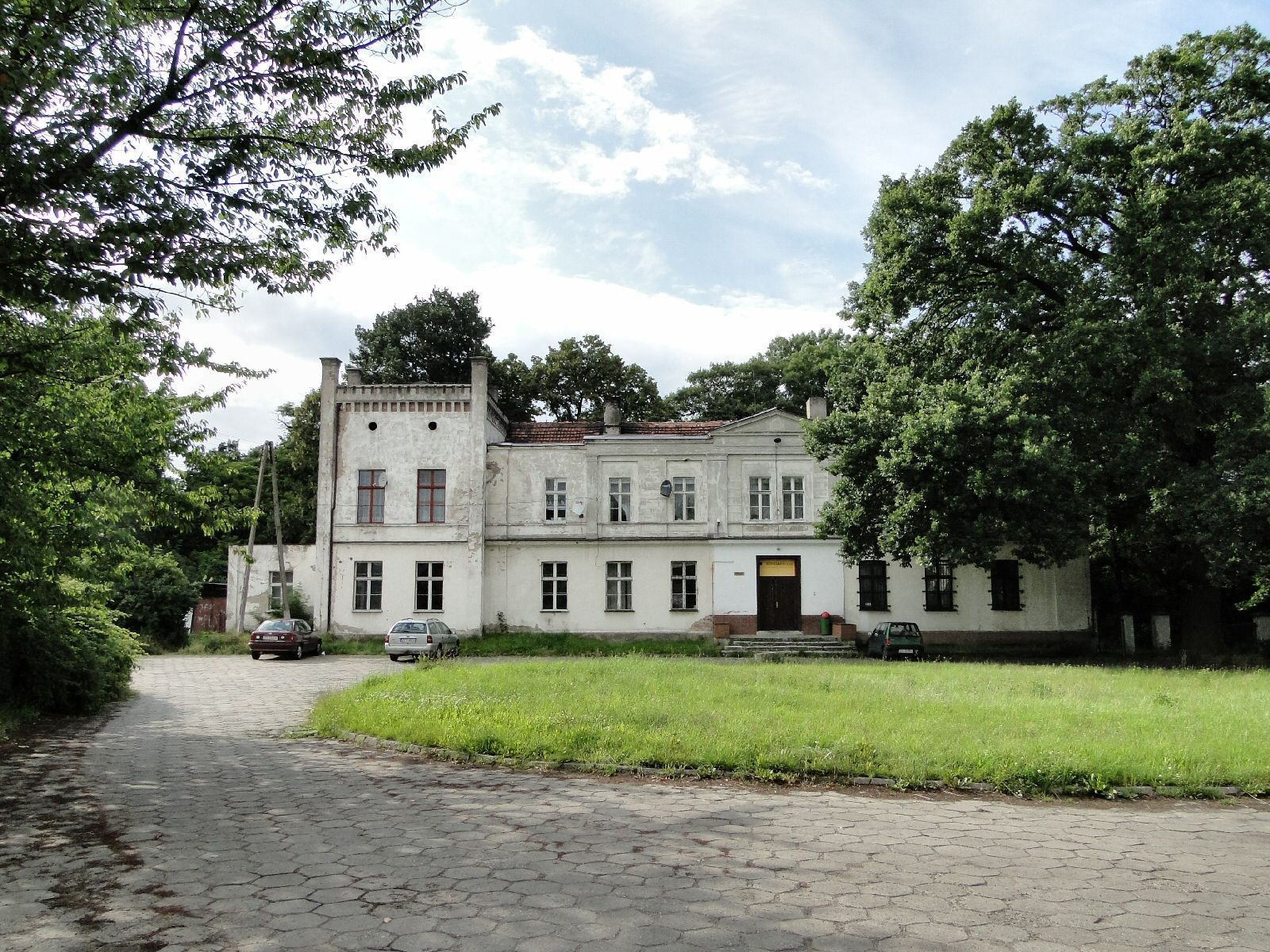
The manor house at 1 Husarów Street, built after 1810.

In 1820, following a legal dispute ending with the abolition of serfdom in a nearby village of Krzekowo (then Kreckow), the city of Szczecin was ordered to grant them 1,726 morgen (440.7 ha) of land. As compensation, the city received 11,129 morgen (2841.5 ha) of land, of which 749 morgen (191.2 ha) were located in Gumieńce. The area was then used to form a hereditary leasehold estate around the hamlet of Ostoja. In 1825, a manor house was also built there, later being expanded in the 1860s. Another manor house was also built after 1810, at the current 1 Husarów Street. By the 19th century, the village of Słowieńsko (also known as Wendzin; German: Wendorf), was also present in the area, at the corner of the current Ku Słońcu and Europejska Streets. In 1862, Gumieńce, Ostoja, and Słowieńsko had a combined population of 770 people, and included 48 households and 64 farm buildings. They also included a small school, adjacent to the church, and four brick works, sourcing local clay and marl, with the largest of them producing two hundred thousand bricks annually. In the second half of the 19th century, a portion of the farmlands of Gumieńce were transferred to the estates of Ostoja and Słowieńsko, reducing the size of the village. By 1865, one large farm and several smaller ones operated in Gumieńce. The area began rapidly developing at the turn of the 20th century, with the development of the housing estates of Gumieńce, Słowieńsko, and Świerczewo, reaching a population of 4,496 people. In 1884, the largest sugar refineries in the Province of Pomerania was opened in Gumieńce at the current Cukrowa Street.. In 1893, the Szczecin Gumieńce railway station, originally known as Scheune, was opened at the corner of the current Cukrowa and Husarów Streets, as part of the Berlin–Szczecin railway line. In 1899, the Gumieńce Wąskotorowe station (German: Scheune Ldb.) was opened next to it as part of the narrow-gauge railway line between Pomorzany and Casekow, which operated until 1946, with most of the rail tracks being removed afterwards.

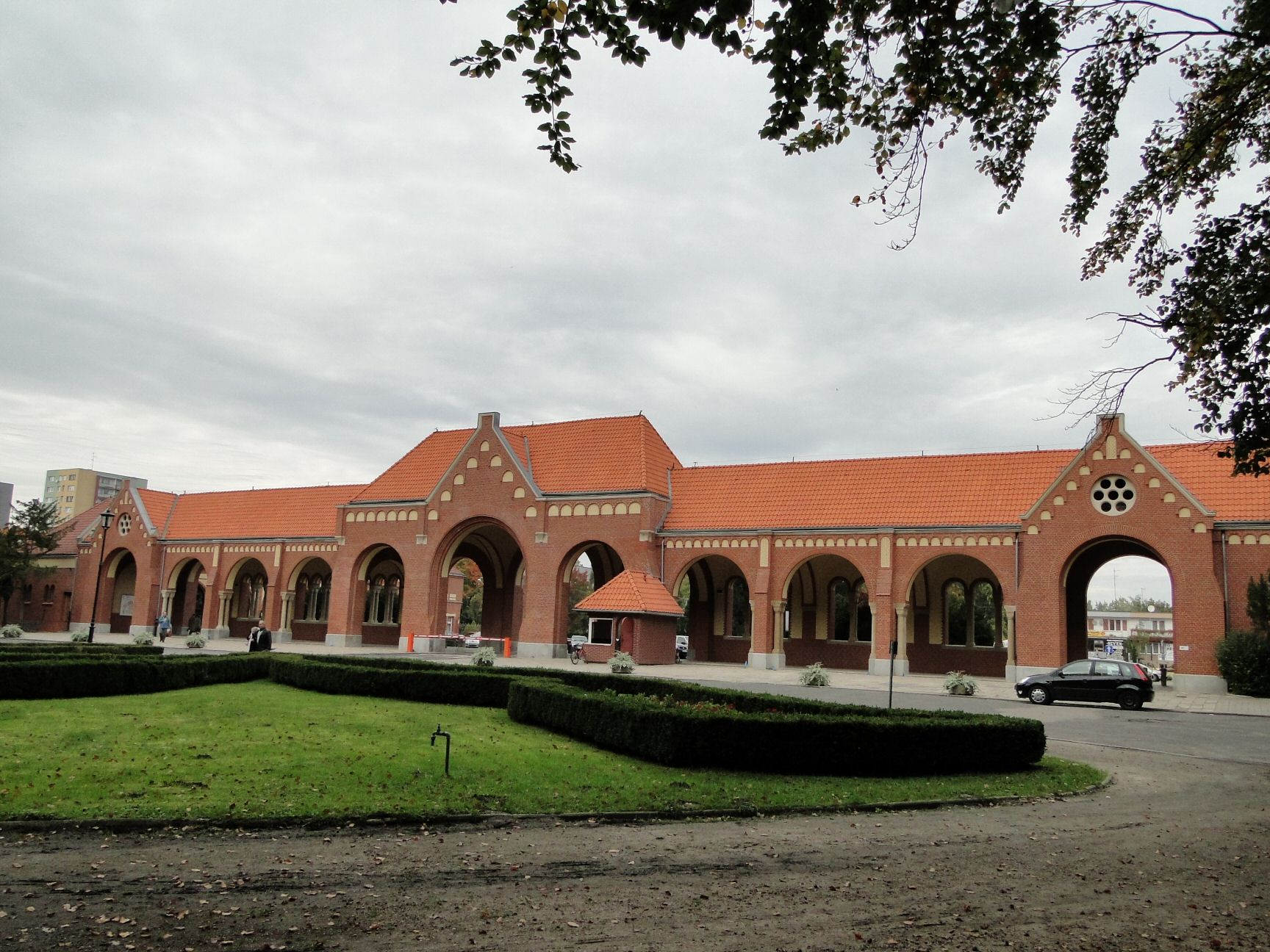
The main gate of the Central Cemetery, built in 1903.

In 1901, the Central Cemetery, originally known as the Main Cemetery, was opened to the east of Gumieńce. The Romanesque Revival chapel and a 77-metre-long (252.63 ft) main entrance gate, were opened in 1903. The cemetery was designed a picturesque park and a memorial garden. It had 57,000 burials by 1918, and 117,000 by 1940. In 1930, a modernist chapel was opened near the current Leszczynowa Street. It was destroyed during the Second World War, and its ruins were removed in 1984. The Romanesque Revival chapel was also damaged during the conflict, and was later destroyed in a fire in 1981, and following a long reconstruction process, it was reopened in 1994. Currently, with the area of 172.33 ha (425.84 acres) it is the largest cemetery in Poland, the third largest in Europe, and one of the largest in the world, and it had over 300,000 burials.

In 1904, the tracks of the tram network of the city of Szczecin were constructed alongside Ku Słońcu Street, ending at the eastern gate of the Central Cemetery. It was further extended in 1927 to the intersection of Ku Słońcu, Derdowskiego, and Europejska Streets, and later in 1955, with a loop alongside Ku Słońcu, Kwiatowa, and Okulickiego Streets.

Between 1924 and 1926, an airstrip was operated near the current Cukrowa Street. In 1936, the Postal Estate (Polish: Osiedle Pocztowe; German: Postsiedlung Sucksdorf) was founded between the current Ku Słońcu, Miarki, Pięknej, and Sucharskiego Streets. Before 1945, it had a population of around five thousand people. Świerczewo was incorporated into the city of Szczecin in 1911, while Gumieńce, Słowieńsko, and Ostoja, on 15 October 1939. During the Second World War, three forced labour camps were operated in Gumieńce. Słowieńsko was destroyed during the conflict, and was not rebuilt afterwards. The area was captured on 26 April 1945 by the 2nd Shock Army of the 2nd Belorussian Front, a part of the Red Army of the Soviet Union. The city was placed under the Polish administration on 5 July 1945, while its suburbs, including Gumieńce and its surroundings, were placed under the Soviet military occupation. It was returned under the Polish control on 4 October 1945, being incorporated back into the city. Ostoja remained as a separate village. The German population either left and was forced out from the city, and was replaced by Polish settlers.

In the 1930s, an artificial pond, now known at the Sunny Lake, was formed by flooding a natural depression, surrounded by a housing estate. In the 1950s, its coast was used as a beach. A garden square, named the Adina Blady-Szwajger Park, was later developed around it. In 2011, the Przygodna Park was also opened on Przygodna Street.

From 1955 to 1976, the neighbourhood of Gumieńce was one of the administrative subdivisions of the Pogodno district. In 1960, it had a population of 9,155 people. On 28 November 1990, the neighbourhood of Gumieńce was established as one of the administrative subdivisions of the West district, being governed by an elected council.

In the 1980s, a housing estate of Reda, consisting of the apartment buildings, was developed at the corner of Krakowska and Południowa Street, for the employees of Polska Żegluga Morska (lit. 'Polish Maritime Shipping').

In 1999, the shopping mall Ster, was opened at 67 Ku Słońcu Street, with a floor area of 32,000 m^{2} (344,445.13 sq ft). In 2020, the shopping centre Rondo Hakena Park, was also opened at 18 and 20 Południowa Street, with a floor area of 10,000 m^{2} (107,639.1 sq ft).

In 2013, the Western Cemetery was opened in the southwest of the neighbourhood, at the corner of Bronowicka and Janiny Smoleńskiej Streets. It failed to become popular with the city inhabitants, with only around 100 burials taking place there by 2015.

Since 2020, the Saint Cyril and Methodius Church, which belongs to the Roman Catholic denomination, is being constructed at 6 Rajkowa Street.

== Characteristics ==
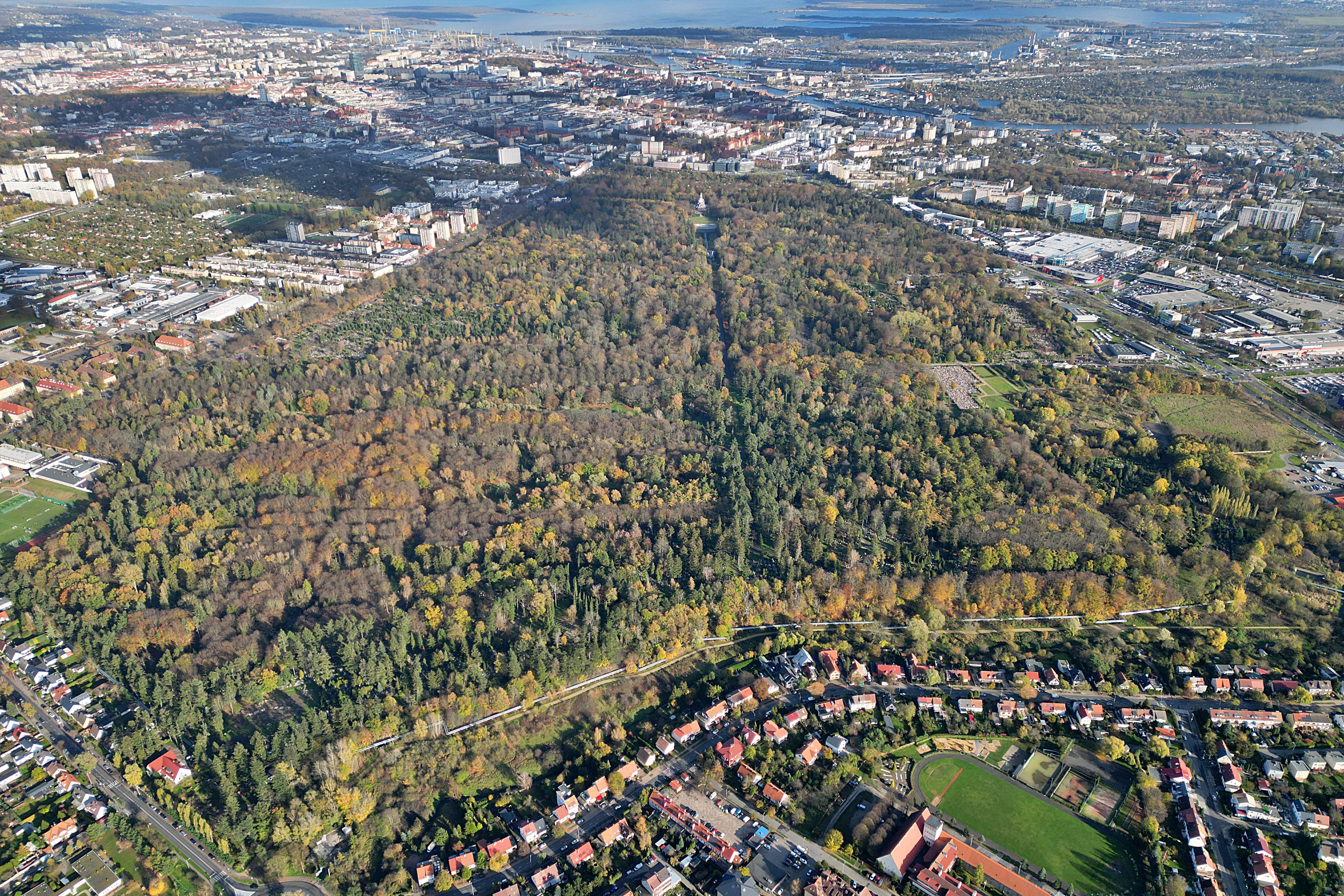
The aerial view of the Central Cemetery, the largest necropolis in Poland, and one of the largest in the world.

Gumieńce is a residential neighbourhood dominated by the low-rise housing. It also includes the housing estate of Reda, consisting of the high-rise apartment buildings, located at the corner of Krakowska and Południowa Street. Within its boundaries, the neighbourhood also includes the historic area of Słowieńsko, placed at the corner of Ku Słuńcu and Europejska Street. Gumieńce have two urban parks, the Adina Blady-Szwajger Park at the corner of Ku Słuńcuand Derdowskiego Streets, and the Przygodna Park on Przygodna Street. The former is centred around the Sunny Lake, an artificial pond formed in the 1930s, with an area of 2 ha (4.9 acres). The neighbourhood also features the shopping centres Ster at 67 Ku Słońcu Street, and Rondo Hakena Park at 18 and 20 Południowa Street.

The northeastern part of the neighbourhood features the Central Cemetery, which had over 300,000 burials, and with an area of 172.33 ha (425.84 acres), is the largest cemetery in Poland, the third largest in Europe, and one of the largest in the world. It includes the Romanesque Revival chapel and a 77-metre-long (252.63 ft) main entrance gate, both dating to 1903. The area has the form of a recreational garden. It features numerous memorials, including to the Brotherhood in Arms, the Heroes of the September 1939, the Victims of Stalinism, To Those Who Did Not Return From the Sea, the Exiles to Siberia, and the Katyń Cross, among others. Additionally, the Western Cemetery is also present in the southwestern part of Gumieńce, at the corner of Bronowicka and Smoleńskiej Streets. The neighbourhood also includes the 19th-century historic buildings of a manor house at 1 Husarów Street, and a smock mill at 24 Mieszka I Street.

Gumieńce also includes the Our Lady of Rosary Church, dating to the 15th century, which is a seat of a Roman Catholic denomination, and is located at the 1 Lwowska Street. Since 2020, another Roman Catholic temple, the Saint Cyril and Methodius Church, is being constructed at 6 Rajkowa Street.

The neighbourhood is served by the Szczecin Gumieńce railway station, located at the corner of Cukrowa and Husarów Streets, being part of the Berlin–Szczecin railway line. It is also connected with the tram network, with tracks alongside Ku Słońcu, Kwiatowa, and Okulickiego Streets.

== Demographics ==
Historical population
Year	2008	2009	2010	2011	2012	2013	2014	2015	2016	2017	2018	2019	2020	2021	2022	2023	2024	2025
Pop.	18,874	18,895	18,761	18,924	19,435	19,795	20,300	20,489	20,769	20,990	21,504	22,060	22,534	22,730	22,834	22,894	22,897	23,031
±%	—	+0.1%	−0.7%	+0.9%	+2.7%	+1.9%	+2.6%	+0.9%	+1.4%	+1.1%	+2.4%	+2.6%	+2.1%	+0.9%	+0.5%	+0.3%	+0.0%	+0.6%

== Government and boundaries ==
Gumieńce is one of the nine administrative neighbourhoods forming the subdivisions of the West district in the city of Szczecin, Poland. It is governed by a locally elected neighbourhood council with 21 members, and a board of administrators with 5 members, the latter chosen internally. Its seat is located at 76 Ku Słońcu Street. It borders the neighbourhoods of Krzekowo-Bezrzecze and Pogodno to the north, Świerczewo to the northeast, Turzyn to the east, and Pomorzany to the south, as well as the municipalities of Dobra Szczecińska and Kołbaskowo in Police County, with the villages of Mierzyn and Warzymice. Its boundaries are approximately determined by Bukowa Street, Witkiewicza Street, Derdowskiego, Ku Słońcu Street, the railway line no. 406, Mieszka I Street, Białowieska Street, railway line no. 432, Krygiera Street, Cukrowa Street, Do Rajkowa Street, railway line no. 408 and 409, Okulickiego Street, Mierzyńska Street, and Welecka Streetm, and alongside the boundaries of the city of Szczecin. Gumieńce have a total area of 10.42 km^{2} (4.02 sq mi).
