= Sunny Lake =

Artificial lake in Szczecin, Poland

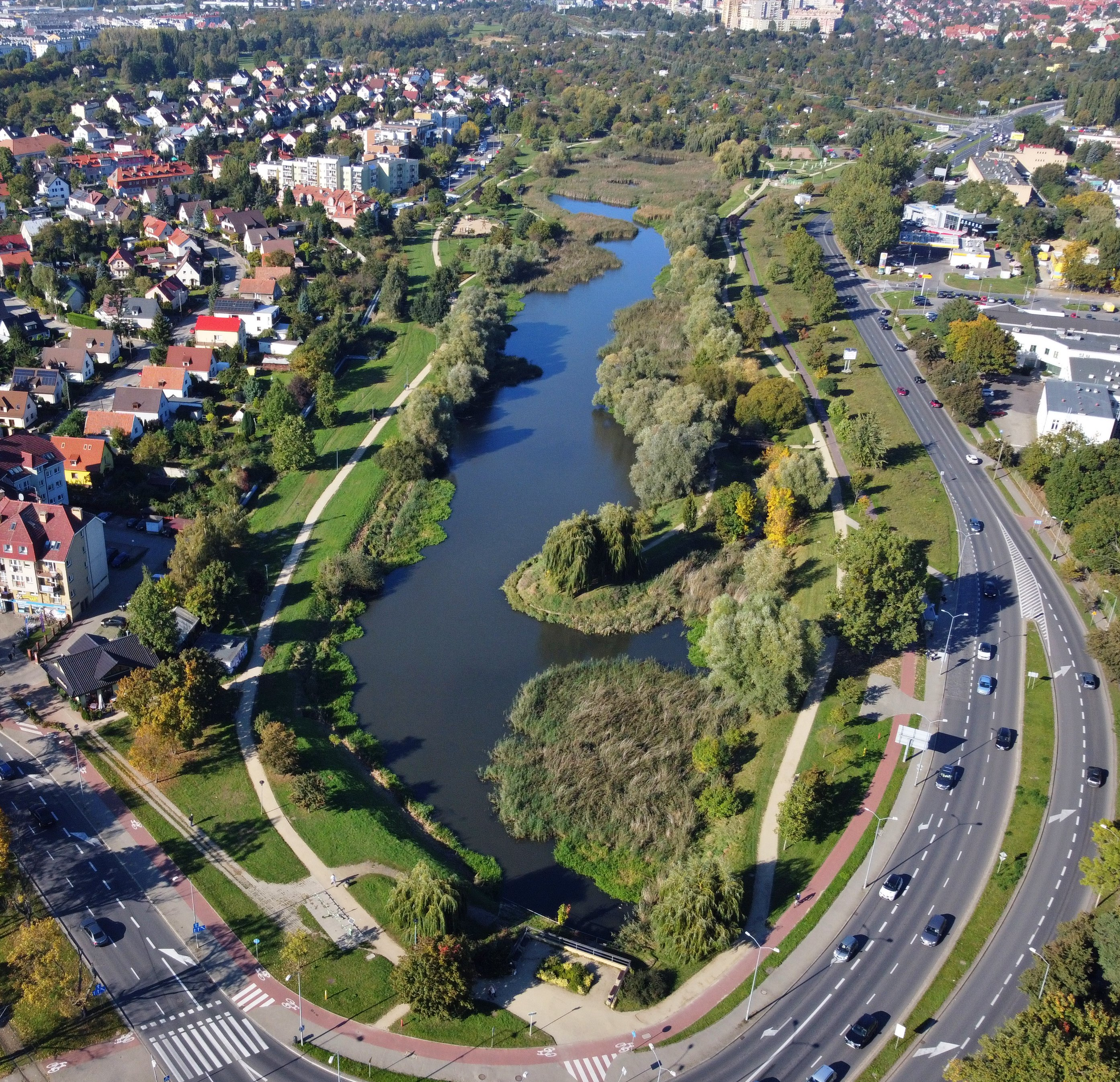
- The lake in 2021.

- Location within Poland
- Location: Szczecin, Poland
- Coordinates: 53°25′29″N 14°29′54″E
- Lake type: Artificial pond
- Primary inflows: Bukowa
- Primary outflows: Bukowa
- Max. length: 1.3 kilometres (0.81 mi)
- Max. width: 0.2 kilometres (0.12 mi)
- Surface area: 2 hectares (4.9 acres)
- Average depth: 2 metres (6 ft 7 in)
- Islands: 1

The Sunny Lake (Polish: Jezioro Słoneczne), known until 1945 as the Reservoir (German: Stau See), is an artificial fresh water lake in Szczecin, Poland in the neighbourhood of Gumieńce, located near the intersection of Derdowskiego and Ku Słońcu Streets. It forms a central point of the Adina Blady-Szwajger Park. The lake was formed in the 1930s.

== History ==
The artificial lake was formed in the 1930s, when a natural depression was flooded by water, after the surrounding it grounds have been developed into a house estate. It was originally referred to as the Reservoir, and after 1945, was renamed to the Sunny Lake. In the 1950s, at its coast was located a beach.

In 2021, area surrounding the lake, commonly referred to as the Green Square Park, have been officially named the Adina Blady-Szwajger Park, after a physician and pediatrician active in the Warsaw Ghetto during the Second World War.

== Characteristics ==
It is a fresh water lake with an elongated shape, maximal length of 1.3 km, and maximal width of 0.2 km, the total area of 2 ha, and the maximum depth of 2 m. It is crossed by the Bukowa river. It induces the Love Island (Polish: Wyspa Miłości), connected to the mainland by a wooden bridge.

It forms the central point of the Adina Blady-Szwajger Park (Polish: Park Adiny Blady-Szwajger), also alternatively known as the Green Square Park (Polish: Park Zieleniec). Its a small urban green area surrounding the lake.
