= Pogodno =

Neighbourhood of Szczecin, Poland

- Administrative neighbourhood
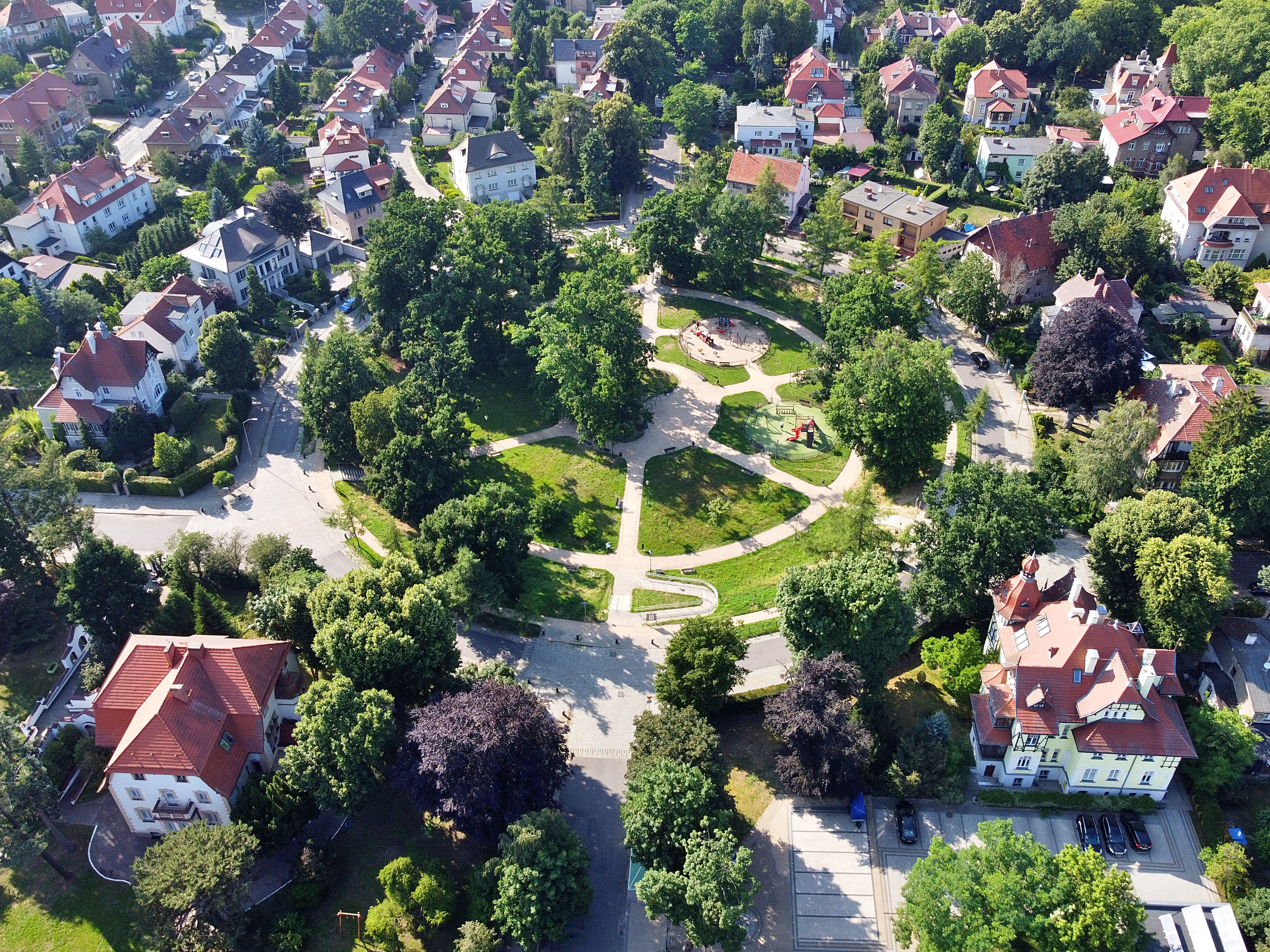
- Jakub Wujek Square in Pogodno

- The location of Pogodno within Szczecin.
- Coordinates: 53°26′48.1″N 14°30′56.8″E
- Country: Poland
- Voivodeship: West Pomeranian
- City and county: Szczecin
- District: West
- Seat: 6 Krasickiego Street

Area
  - Total: 4.19 km^{2} (1.62 sq mi)

Population (2025)
  - Total: 21,530
  - Density: 5,140/km^{2} (13,300/sq mi)
- Time zone: UTC+1 (CET)
  - Summer (DST): UTC+2 (CEST)
- Area code: +48 91
- Car plates: ZS

Pogodno (Polish: [pɔˈɡɔd.nɔ]; German until 1947: Neu-Westend [ˈnɔʏ ˈvɛstʔ.ɛnt]) is an administrative neighbourhood forming a subdivision of the West district in the city of Szczecin, Poland. It is predominantly a low-rise residential area with detached and semi-detached houses. It also includes the housing estate of Osiedle Somiesiery with the mid-rise apartment buildings. Pogodno has an area of 4.19 km^{2} (1.62 sq mi), and in 2025, was inhabited by 21,530 people, making it the second most populous neighbourhood of the city. The neighbourhood features the Florian Krygier Municipal Stadium, the home field of the Pogoń Szczecin association football team, and faculty buildings of several universities. In the 19th century, the complex of military barracks was constructed in the western portion of the modern neighbourhood. The area begun being developed in 1890 as a suburb, and was incorporated into Szczecin in 1910.

== Toponymy ==
The name Pogodno is derived from the Polish adjective pogodny, meaning "cheerful", "sunny", or "serene". Established officially by the government in 1947, it was intended to have optimistic and positive emotional connotations, intended to facilitate the psychological adaptation and settlement of Polish population moving into the city following the end of the Second World War. The naming process was part of a broader, systemic campaign implemented across the areas ceded to Poland from German after the conflict, then referred to as the Recovered Territories.

Prior to 1947, the neighbourhood was known by its German name Neu-Westend, meaning "New West End". It was named as an extension of the nearby area of Westend, located to its southeast, now known as Łękno. Its name itself referred to the area forming the suburb of the city of Szczecin, being placed at its western boundary.

== History ==
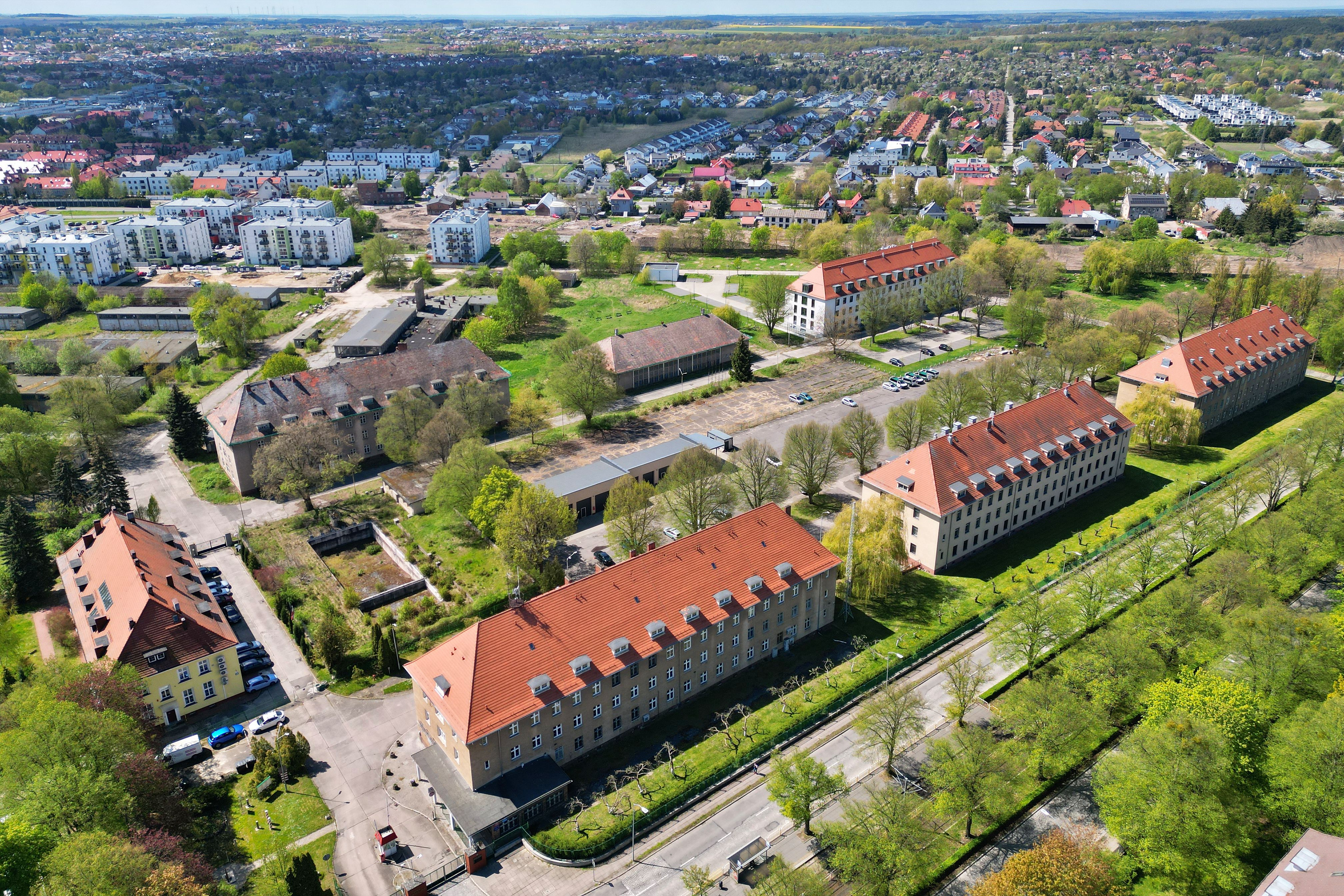
The former military barracks complex at Żołnierska Street, founded in the 19th century, within the current boundaries of Pogodno.

Following the capitulation of Stettin in 1806 during the War of the Fourth Coalition, a military camp of the French Imperial Army was set up in the area, housing housing 12,000 soldiers. In 1808, a small mound with the height of 8 m (26.25 ft), was erected at the current corner of Klonowica and Unii Lubelskiej Streets. It was named the Napoleon Hill, in commemoration of Napoleon Bonaparte, the Emperor of France. A bust depicting him was placed at its top. In 1814, after the city was recaptured by Prussia, it was renamed to the German Mountain (Deutscher Berg), and the sculpture was replaced with a column decorated with an Iron Cross, and a plaque dedicated to Prussian soldiers fallen during the War of the Sixth Coalition. It was renamed to its original name after the end of the Second World War.

In the 19th century, a complex of barracks of the Prussian Army was developed in the area between the current Żołnierska, Klonowica, and Wernyhory Streets, to the east of the village of Krzekowo. A large military training area, named the Krzekowo Filed (German: Kreckower Feld), was created to the north of the barracks. In 1862, it included ten residential buildings, as well as other military structures. It was expanded in the following decades. In 1897, it had five residential barracks, as well as gastronomical buildings, bathhouses, horse stables, administrative buildings, and warehouses. In 1910, the entire complex had an area of 362.94 ha. In the following years, it was expanded with buildings on Klonowica Street. The military also owned nearby shooting ranges at the intersection of the current Polish Armed Forces Avenue and Szeroka Street. The complex was visited by emperor Wilhelm I on 13 October 1897. Around 1930, a new complex of complex was developed to the south, at the corner of the current Łukasińskiego and Sosabowskiego Streets for the infantry soldiers. Between 1935 and 1936, new barracks were constructed in the complex, between the current Klonowica, Janickiego, Mickiewicza, and Żołnierska Streets.

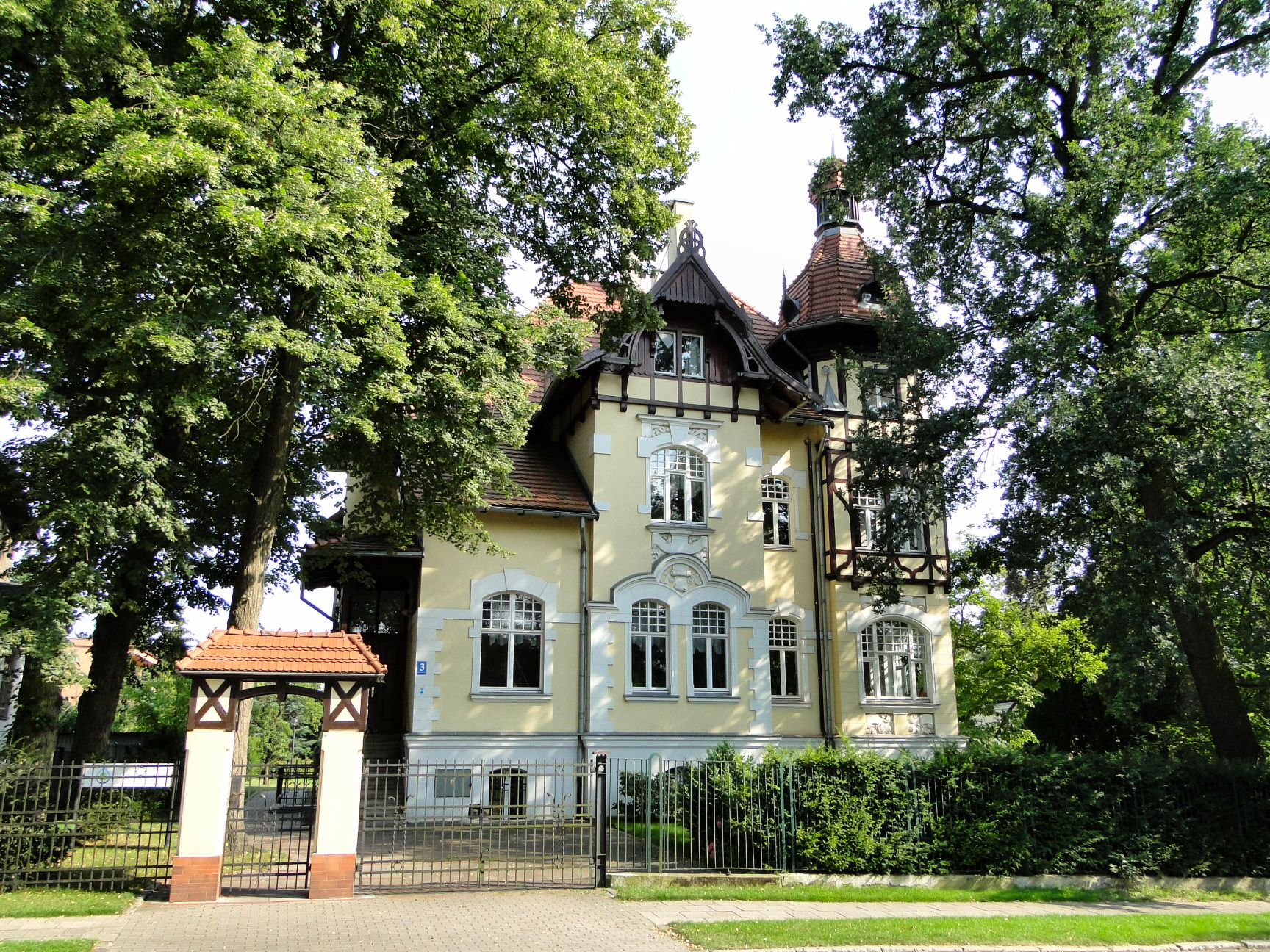
A villa at 3 Solskiego Street dating to 1902, one of historic houses in Pogodno.

In 1890, the company Westend Stettin Bauverein auf Aktien, owned by Martin Quistorp, begun developing suburb estate of Neu-Westend (lit. 'New West End'), located just outside borders of the city of Szczecin (then Stettin). It was constructed between current Mickiewicza Street and Polish Armed Forces Avenue, to the northwest of the suburb of Westend, now known as Łękno, which was founded in 1871 by Martin's father, Johannes Quistorp. The roundabout and garden square, originally called the Johannes Square, and now known as the Jakub Wujek Square, became its central point. The surrounding streets were named after other members of the Quistorp family. Nearby, the small park, now known as the Łyczewek Park, was also founded. The suburb was developed with detached homes and villas, designed in Baroque Revival, Modernist, and Renaissance Revival styles.

In 1893, a factory of prefabricated concrete materials was built in the suburb, and in the year 1900, waterworks and a power plant were also opened. In 1899, the Stoewer car factory was opened at 186 Polish Armed Forces Avenue. It operated until the end of the Second World War, afterwards being used by for the manufacturing of Ursus tractors, household furniture, and car parts. In 1967, it was renamed to the Polmo Car Parts Factory. It was closed in 2011, and turned into a shopping mall. Currently, it is located within boundaries of the neighbourhood of Zawadzkiego-Klonowica.

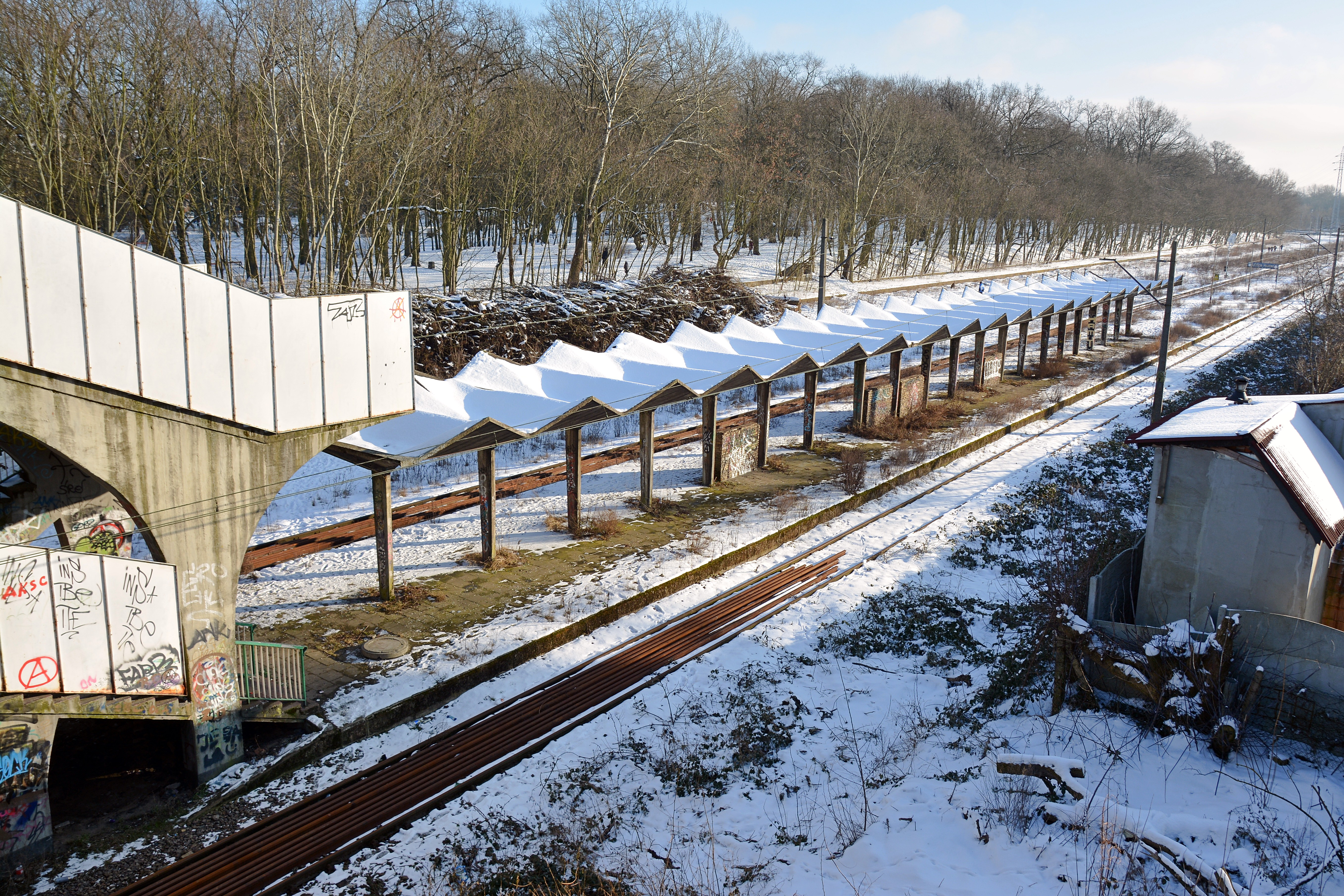
The Szczecin Pogodno railway station, dating to 1898.

In 1898, two railway stations were opened in the area. They were Szczecin Pogodno (then Stettin Kreckower Straße), located at Mickiewicza Street, and Szczecin Łekno (then Stettin Westend), located at Majdańskiego Street. a brutalist steel canopy, now listed on the regional heritage list was constructed at the Szczecin Pogodno station. Both stations were closed for passenger traffic in 2002. The Szczecin Pogodno station continues to be sporadically used for cargo, and to provide connections to the nearby Florian Krygier Municipal Stadium during association football matches. Currently, they are planned to be reopened in 2026, as part of the Szczecin Metropolitan Railway line.

In 1904, a school for the deaf, founded by Martin Quistorp, was opned at 2 Siemiradzkiego Street. Currently, its building is used as a primary school.

In 1906, the tram network was extended alongside Polish Armed Forces Avenue to the intersection with Pola Street. It was later again extended to the north, with the construction of the Pogodno tram depot at 200 Polish Armed Forces Avenue in 1938. The building was later renovated in 1983. Currently, it is located within the neighbourhood of Zawadzkiego-Klonowica.

The neighbourhood was bought by the city in 1908, which then incorporated it into its boundaries in 1910. At the beginning of the 20th century, the suburb of Braunsfelde was developed between the current Czorsztyńska and Poniatowskiego Streets, being named after one its first residents, Otton Braun, meaning "Braun's field" in German. Later, the neighbourhood of was developed between the current Hoene-Wrońskiego, Mickiewicza, Sienkiewicza, and Traugutta Streets. Its name translates to "Ackermann's hill", being named after the then city high mayor, Friedrich Ackermann, who proposed its construction. Additionally, in the area of Somosierry Street was also present the neighbourhood of Schönau (meaning "beautiful view" in German).

In 1925, the association football stadium, originally called the Rühl Arena, and now known as the Florian Krygier Municipal Stadium, was opened at the current 28 Karłowicza Street. It served as the home field of the team VfL Stettin. The building was rebuilt in 1949, following the Second World War, and begun hosting team Pogoń Szczecin in 1955. It was again rebuilt in 2022.

Around 1926, the Szczecin Botanical Garden begin being develop to the east of the suburb, fearing an alpine garden and greenhouses with exotic plants. The works were halted by the outbreak of the Second World War, and it was eventually finished in the 1950s. Currently, it is located within boundaries of the neighbourhoods of Arkońskie-Niemierzyn and Łękno

In 1930, the Holy Cross Church was opened at the current Wieniawskiego Street, in the place of a former chapel from 1834. It belonged to the Protestant denomination. In 1946, it was adopted into a Roman Catholic parish church. The temple was further expanded in 1978, with a new conjoined building.

In the 1930s, the Hitler Youth Sports Field (German: Hitlerjugend Sport-Platz), begun being developed at the current Unii Lubelskiej Street, being envisioned to become the largest sports complex in Europe, with several fields, and total capacity of 100,000 spectators. It was never finished, and its construction abandoned, most likely due to the enormous financial costs.

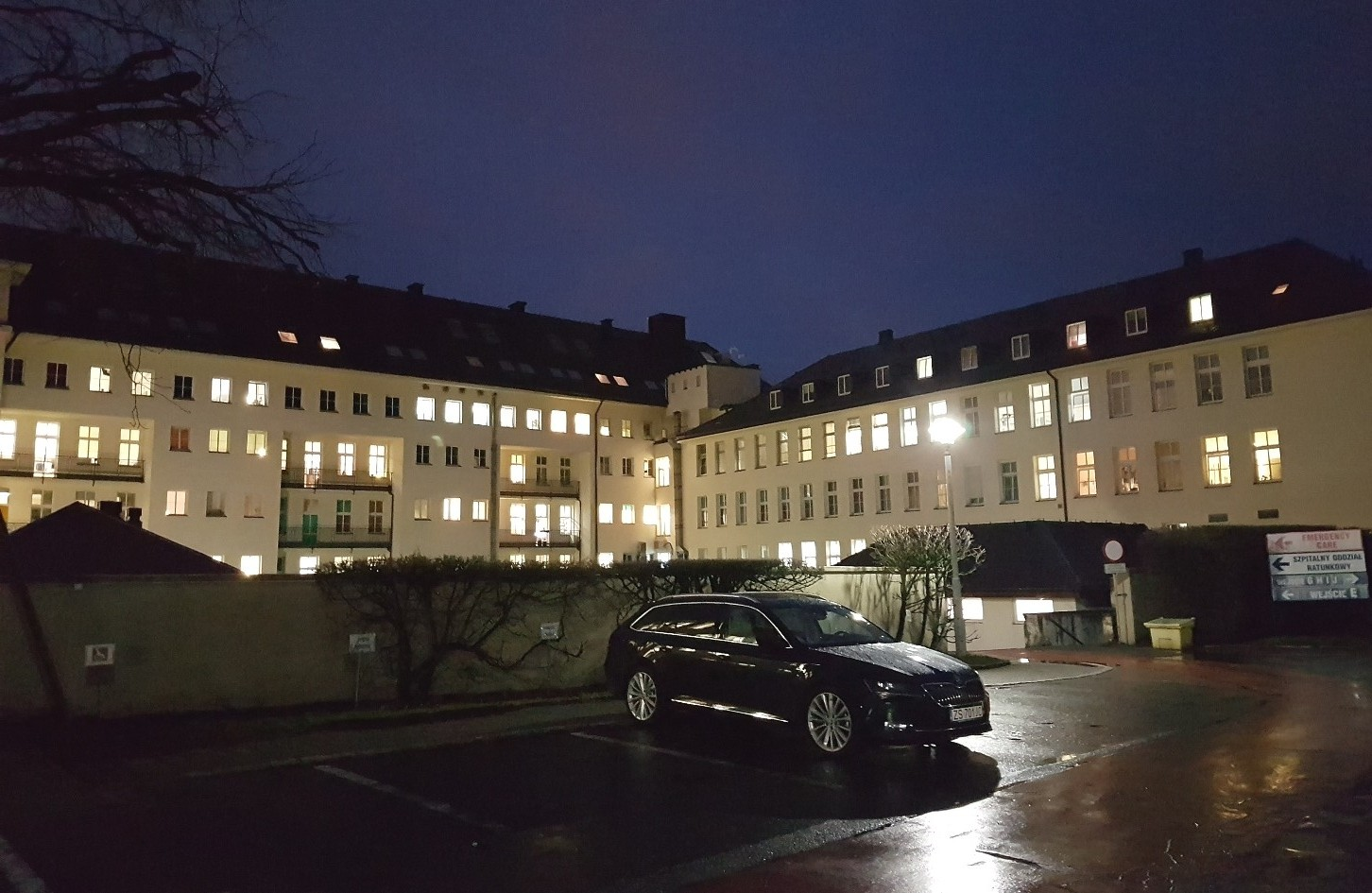
The Professor Tadeusz Sokołowski Academic Clinical Hospital no. 1 of the Pomeranian Medical University, dating in 1940.

In 1940, a large hospital complex, now known as the Professor Tadeusz Sokołowski Academic Clinical Hospital no. 1 of the Pomeranian Medical University, was opened at the current 1 Unii Lubelskiej Street was opened a large hospital complex. During the Second World War, it was used as a training facility for medical students. It was reopened after the end of the conflict in 1947, as a hospital of the Polish Red Cross. In 1949, it was donated to the state, and a year later, it became a facility to the Pomeranian Medical University.

On 26 April 1945, during the Second World War, it was captured by the 2nd Shock Army of the 2nd Belorussian Front, a part of the Red Army of the Soviet Union. While retreating from the city in 1945, German forces destroyed all bridges and viaducts in the neighbourhood, connecting it to the Downtown, while the buildings survived without major damages. The city, including the neighbourhood, was placed under the Polish administration on 5 July 1945. The German population either left or was forced out from the city, and was replaced by Polish settlers. In 1947, Neu Westend was renamed to Pogodno, and it 1950, it became one of the subdivisions of the city district of Pogodno, named after the neighbourhood, also incorporating areas of Ackermannshöhe, Braunsfelde, Schönau. In 1960, it had a population of 30,030 people. It was administrated by an elected council, which was disbanded in 1976, a year after the city district was abolished. On 28 November 1990, the neighbourhood of Pogodno was established as one of the administrative subdivisions of the West district, being governed by an elected council.

In 1946, the Trade Academy was opened at 66 Mickiewicza Street, as a branch of the Poznań University of Economics and Business, and forming the first university opened in the city after the Second World War. In 1950, it became an independent institution, and was renamed to the Higher School of Economics. In 1955, it was transformed into the Faculty of Engineering and Transport Economics of the Szczecin University of Technology, and in 1985, again into the faculty of the University of Szczecin, later renamed to the Faculty of Economics and Management. In 2019, it became part of new Faculty of Economics, Finances, and Management. In 1995, the Higher School of Public Administration was founded at 1A Siemiradzkiego Street, and in 2000, the Faculty of Architecture of the Szczecin University of Technology was opened at 50 Żołnierska Street.

After the end of the Second World II in 1945, the northern barracks complex on Żołnierska Street begun briefly housing soldiers of the Red Army of the Soviet Union, and later the soldiers of the Polish Land Forces, which used it until 2002. In 1995, the building at 47 Żołnierska Street begun housing the Faculty of Economics of the Szczecin University of Technology, which was replaced by the West Pomeranian University of Technology in 2009. The campus was expanded in the following decades, currently housing faculties and buildings of the Maritime University of Szczecin, the Pomeranian Medical University, and the West Pomeranian University of Technology. (Note: Attributed to multiple references:) It also houses the West Pomeranian Business School, a private university founded in 1989, located at 53 Żołnierska Street. The southern complex on Łukasińskiego Street continues to be used by the military, since 1999, housing the headquarters of the Multinational Corps Northeast of NATO. It was originally founded in the cooperation between Denmark, Germany, and Poland, being since then expanded with more countries.

Between 1988 and 1995, the housing estate of Osiedle Somosierry was developed alongside Somosierry Street, and between Grota-Roweckiego, Łukasińskiego, Taczaka, and Stwosza Streets, consisting of the mid-rise apartment buildings. It was constructed in the location of the former neighbourhood of Schönau.

In 1994, the Church of the Holiest Redeemer was opened at 10 Popiełuszki Street, constituting a seat of a Roman Catholic parish.

== Characteristics ==
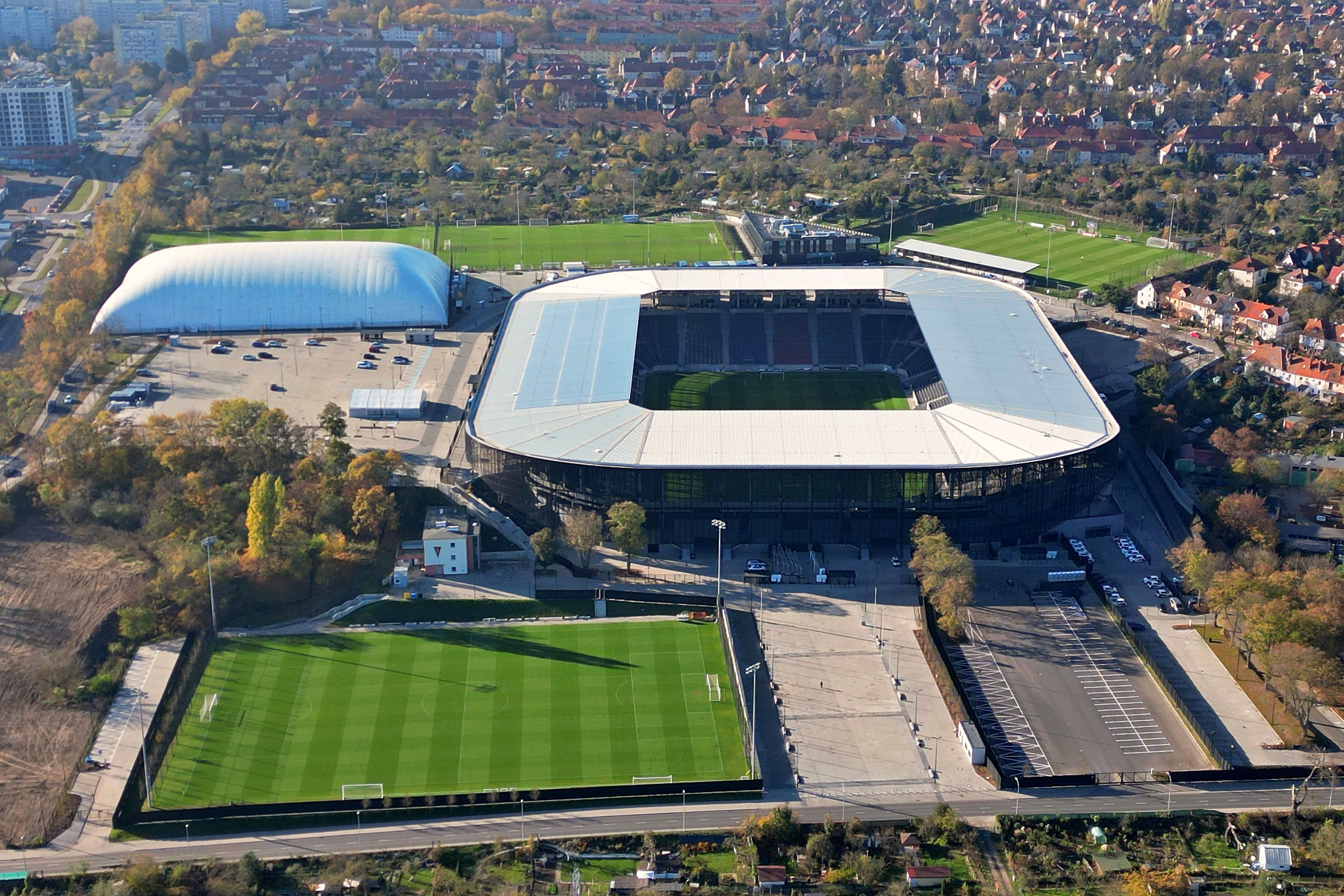
The Florian Krygier Municipal Stadium in Pogodno.

Pogodno is predominantly a low-rise residential area with detached and semi-detached houses. It includes numerous historic villas built in Baroque Revival, Modernist, and Renaissance Revival styles, dating to the late 19th and early 20th centuries. Its small portion, between Grota-Roweckiego, Łukasińskiego, Taczaka, and Stwosza Streets, includes the housing estate of Osiedle Somosierry with the mid-rise apartment buildings. The urban green spaces within the neighbourhood include the Jakub Wujek Square, Łyczywek Park, and Pawłowski Square. Additionally, the Napoleon Hill, a 8-metre-tall (26.25 ft) mound is located at the corner of Klonowica and Unii Lubelskiej Streers, being erected in the commemoration of Napoleon Bonaparte, the Emperor of France, in 1808. The Florian Krygier Municipal Stadium, the home field of the Pogoń Szczecin association football team, is also located at 28 Karłowicza Street. Pogodno also features the Szczecin Pogodno railway station, placed on Mickiewicza Street. It includes a historic brutalist steel canopy from 1976, listed on a heritage list. Since 2002, the station is predomidently used for cargo trains, being closed for passengers, with the exception of providing connections to the nearby stadium during the sport events.

Pogodno houses higher education institutions such as the faculties of the Maritime University of Szczecin, Pomeranian Medical University, University of Szczecin, West Pomeranian University of Technology. (Note: Attributed to multiple references:) It also includes the West Pomeranian Business School, which operates a private proprietary university. Additionally, it also houses the Professor Tadeusz Sokołowski Academic Clinical Hospital no. 1 of the Pomeranian Medical University, located at 1 Unii Lubelskiej Street. The neighbourhood includes two Roman Catholic parish churches, the Holy Cross Church at 5 Wieniawskiego Street, and the Church of the Holiest Redeemer at 10 Popiełuszki Street.

Pogodno also houses the headquarters of the Multinational Corps Northeast of NATO, located at 33 Łukasińskiego Street.

== Demographics ==
Historical population
Year	2008	2009	2010	2011	2012	2013	2014	2015	2016	2017	2018	2019	2020	2021	2022	2023	2024	2025
Pop.	25,956	25,826	25,384	25,236	25,241	25,119	24,679	24,466	24,140	23,839	23,569	23,446	23,242	22,925	22,410	22,088	21,788	21,530
±%	—	−0.5%	−1.7%	−0.6%	+0.0%	−0.5%	−1.8%	−0.9%	−1.3%	−1.2%	−1.1%	−0.5%	−0.9%	−1.4%	−2.2%	−1.4%	−1.4%	−1.2%

== Government and boundaries ==
Pogodno is one of the nine administrative neighbourhoods forming the subdivisions of the West district in the city of Szczecin, Poland. It is governed by a locally elected neighbourhood council with 21 members, and a board of administrators with 5 members, the latter chosen internally. Its seat is located at 6 Krasickiego Street. The neighbourhood borders Zawadzkiego-Klonowica to the northwest, Arkońskie-Niemierzyn to the northeast, Łękno and Turzyn to the east, Świerczewo and Gumieńce to the south, and Krzekowo-Bezrzecze to the west. Its boundaries are approximately determined by Klonowica Street, Unii Lubelskiej, Polish Armed Forces Avenue, Szczecin Botanical Garden, Kochanowskiego Street, tracks of the railway line no. 406, Henryka Sienkiewicza Street, Mickiewicza Street, Witkiewicza Street, and Bracka Street. Pogodno has a total area of 4.19 km^{2} (1.62 sq mi).
