= Jakub Wujek Square =

Square in Szczecin, Poland

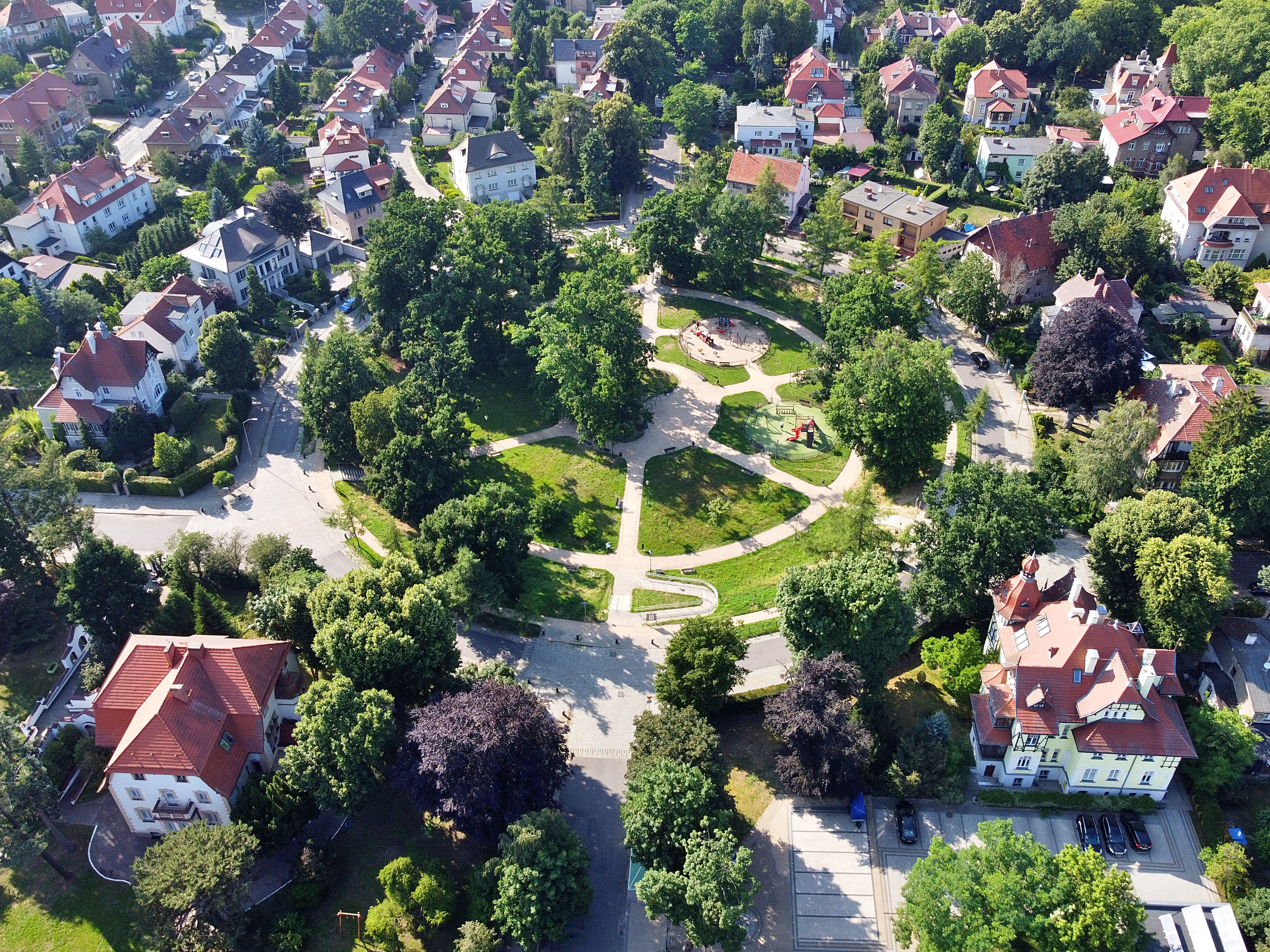
- Jakub Wujek Square in 2021.

- Location within Poland
- Former name: Johannes Square (1890s–1945)
- Namesake: Jakub Wujek
- Type: Garden square, roundabout
- Location: Szczecin, Poland
- Coordinates: 53°26′48.1″N 14°30′56.8″E
- North: Solskiego Street
- East: Przerwy-Tetmajera Street
- South: Bajana Street
- West: Przerwy-Tetmajera Street

Construction
- Completion: 1890s

Jakub Wujek Square (Polish pronunciation: [ˈja.kup ˈvu.jɛk]; Polish: Plac Jakuba Wujka) is a circular garden square and a roundabout in Szczecin, Poland. It is placed on the axis of Przerwy-Tetmajera Street in the municipal neighbourhood of Pogodno, within the West district. It is surrounded by historical villas dating to the early 20th century. The square was developed in the 1890s.

== History ==
The garden square was constructed in the 1890s as the central point of the then-developed housing estate of Neu Westend (now known as Pogodno). The community was financed and constructed by the Westend Stettin joint-stock company, owned by local entrepreneur Johannes Quistorp. The garden was named after him the Johannes Square (German: Johannesplatz). The five streets intersecting at the roundabout surrounding the square were also named after several members of the Quistorp family. They were renamed after the community was incorporated into the city of Szczecin in 1910.

At the beginning of the 20th century, villa houses were constructed around the square and were designed in Baroque Revival, Modernist, and Renaissance Revival styles. Most of them survive to the present day.

In 1945, it was renamed after Jakub Wujek, a 16th-century theologist and translator.

The square was renovated in 2009.

== Characteristics ==
Jakub Wujek Square is a circular garden square in the municipal neighbourhood of Pogodno, within the district of Zachód. It's surrounded by a roundabout and is placed at the axis of Przerwy-Tetmajera Streed. It forms an intersection of Bajana, Przerwy-Tetmajera, and Solskiego Streets. Around it are historical villas from the early 20th century, designed in Baroque Revival, Modernist, and Renaissance Revival styles, and a few modern houses.

== Gallery ==
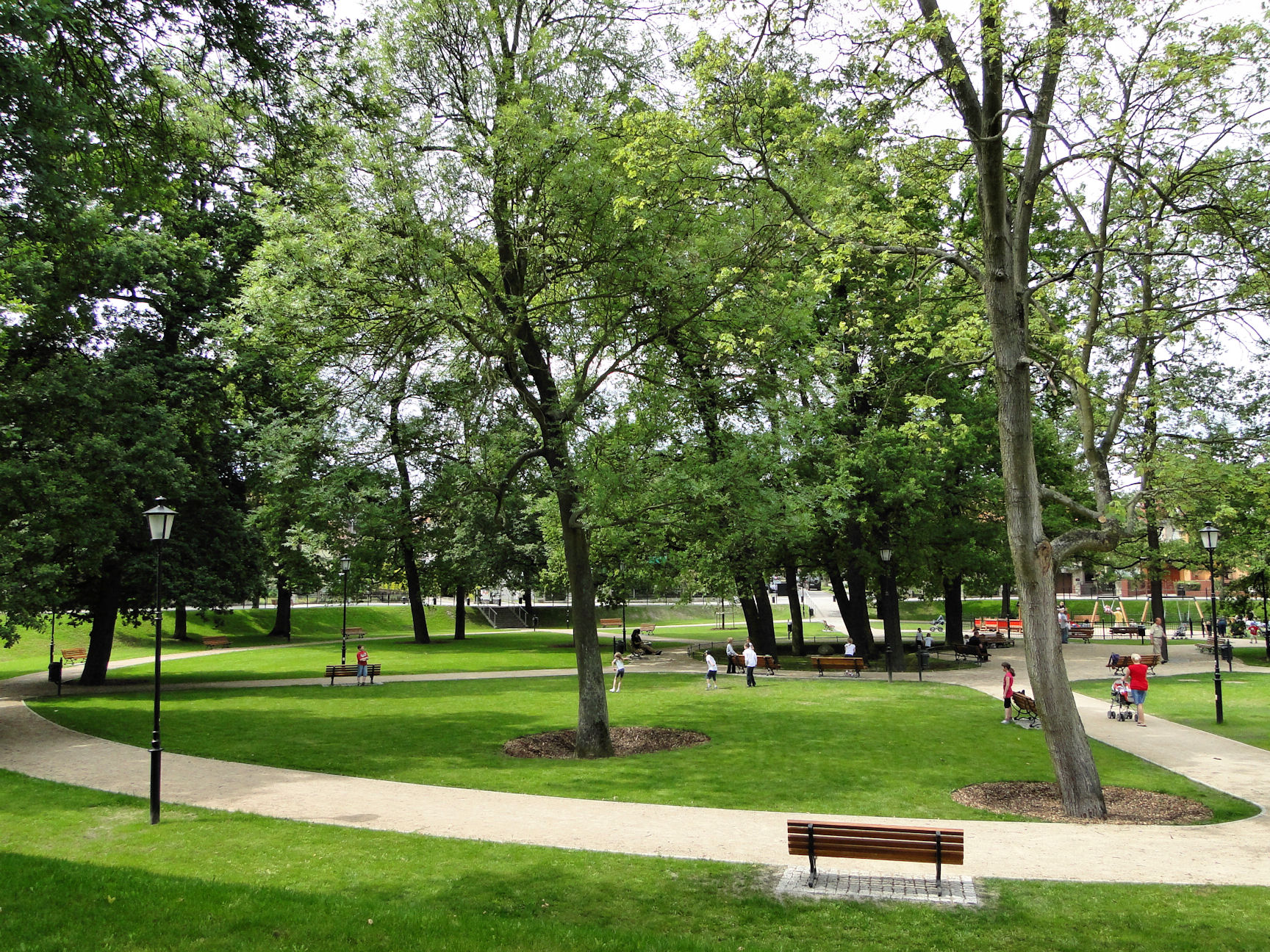
Wester side of Wujek Square in 2010.

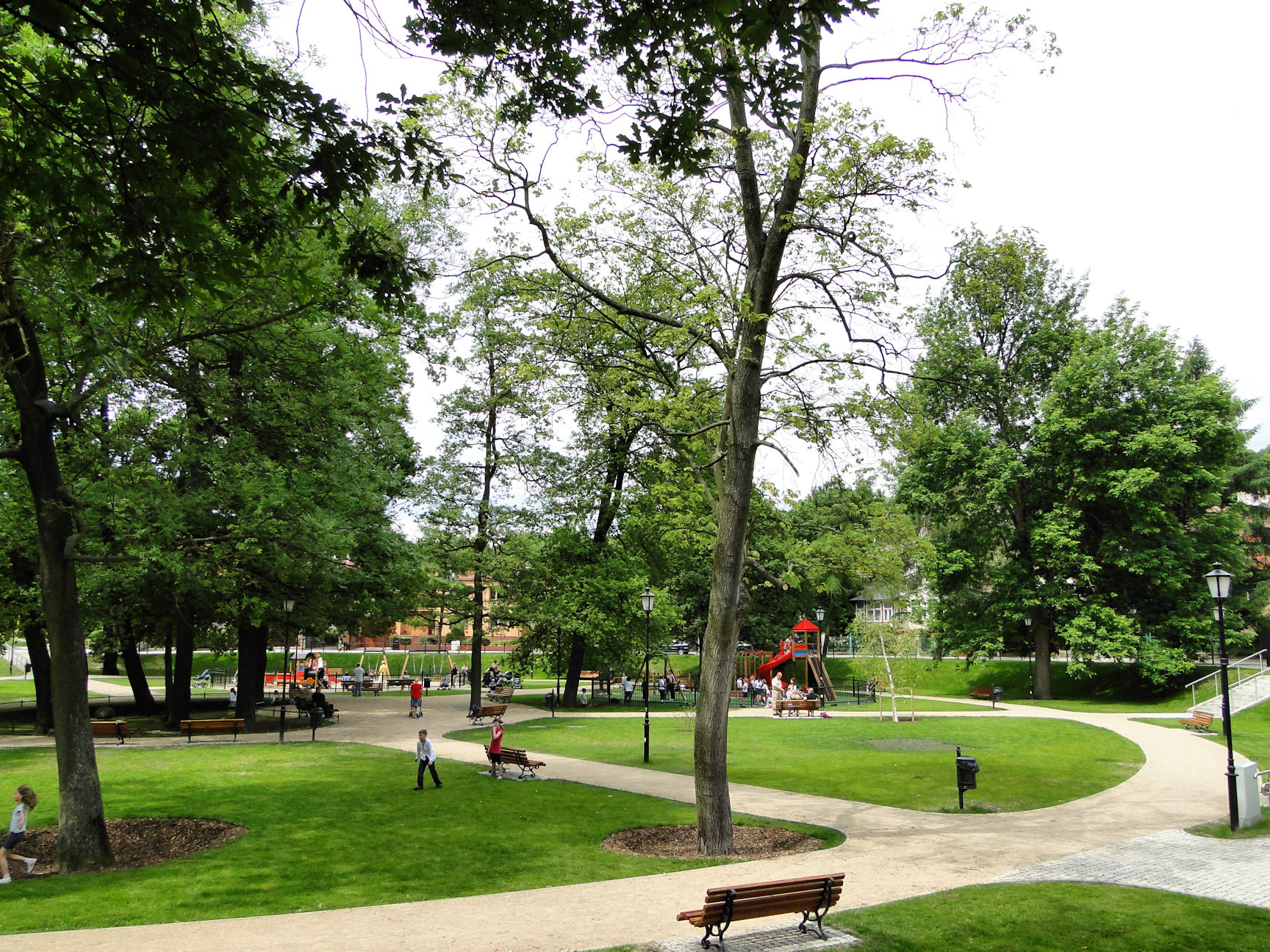
Eastern side of Wujek Square in 2010.

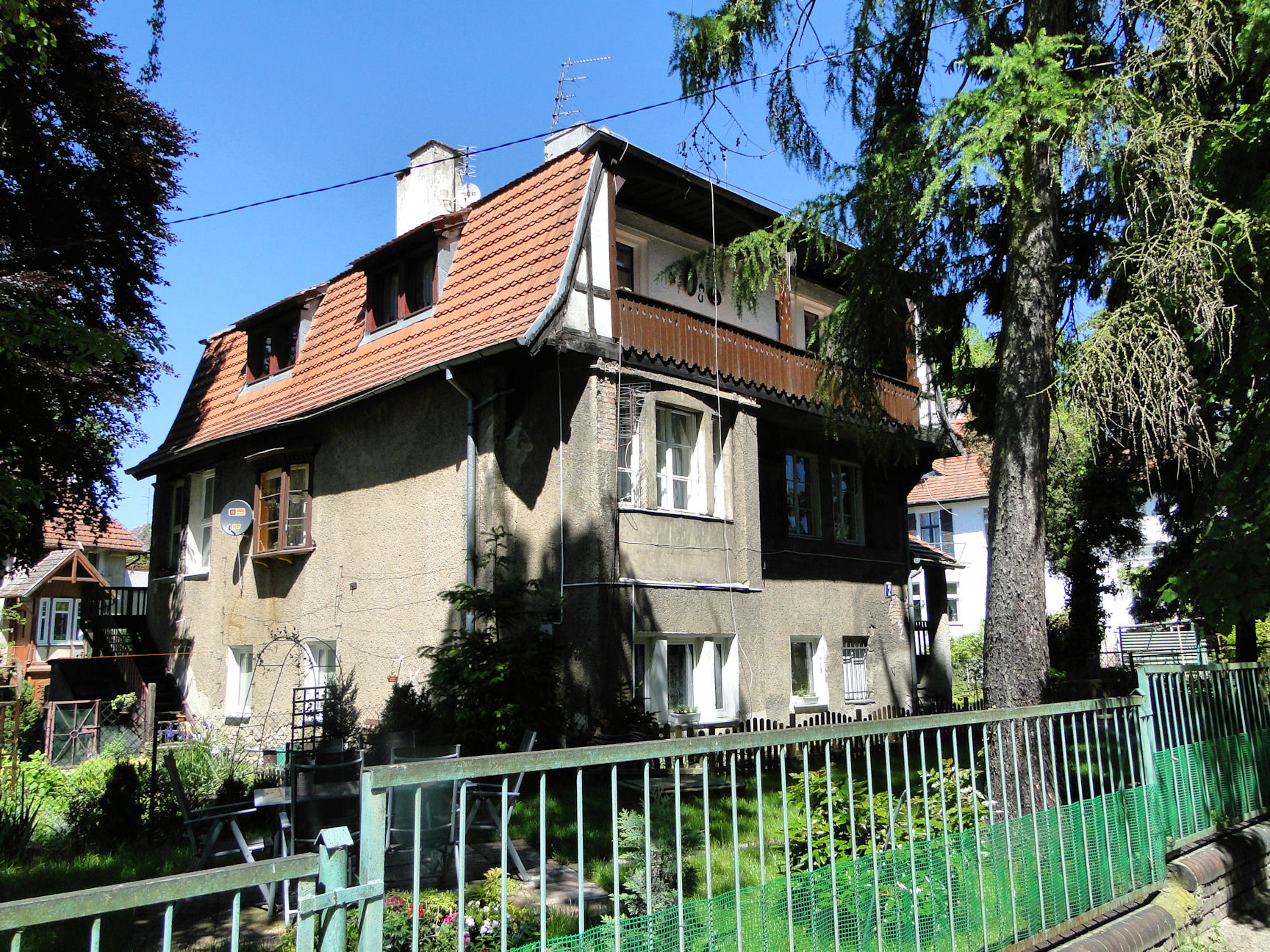
Villa at 2 Solskiego Street.

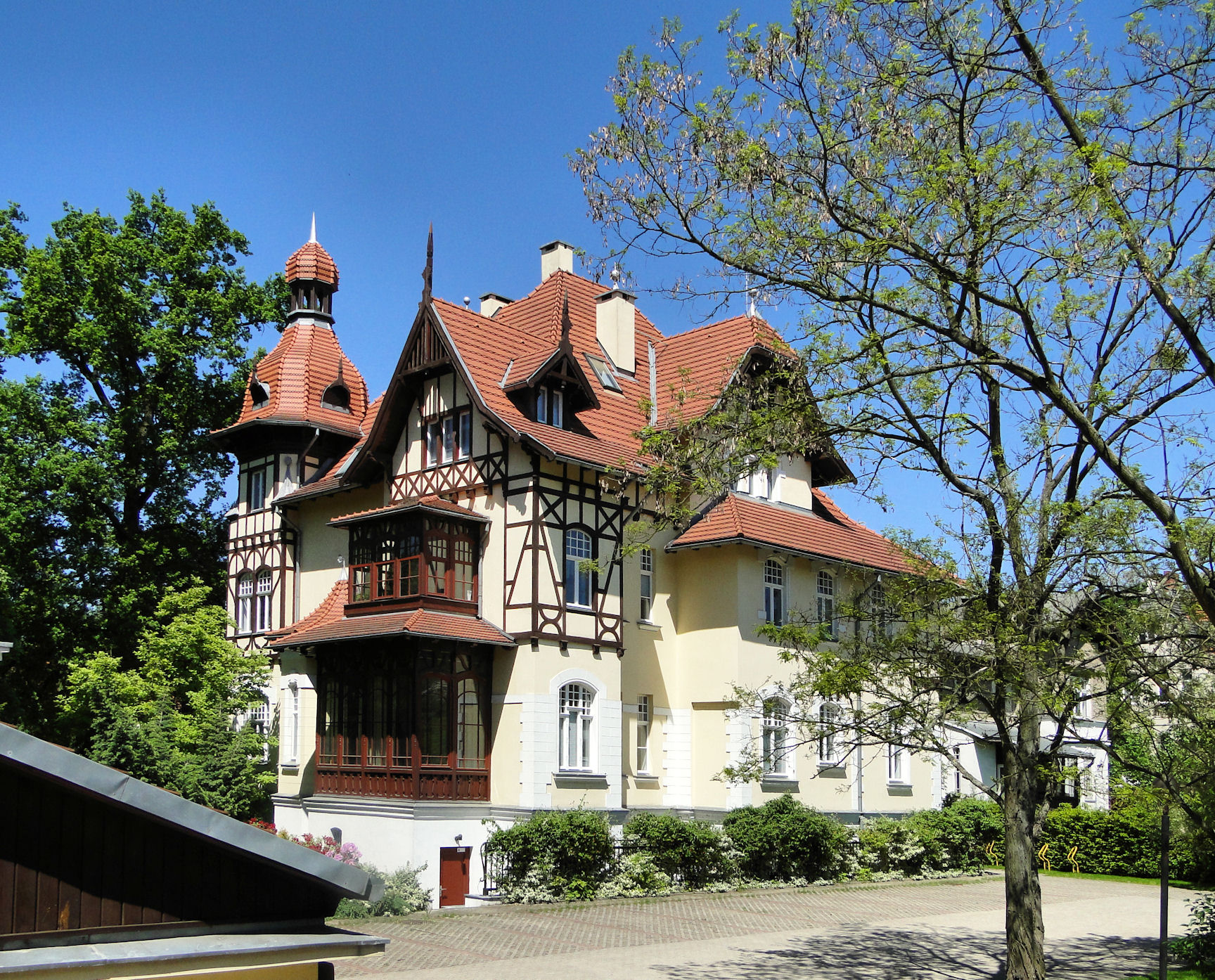
Villa at 3 Solskiego Street.

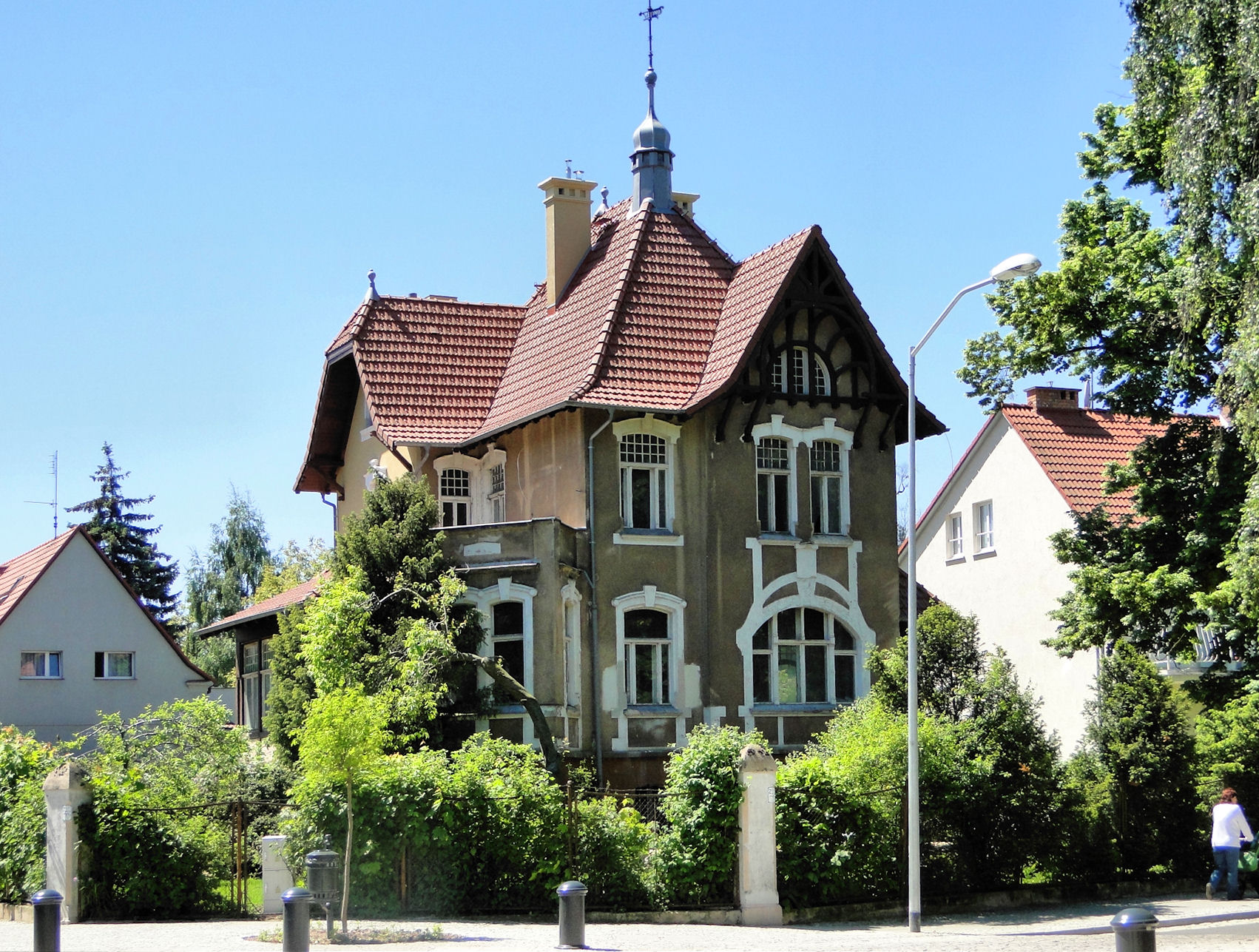
Villa at 1 Baluckiego Street.

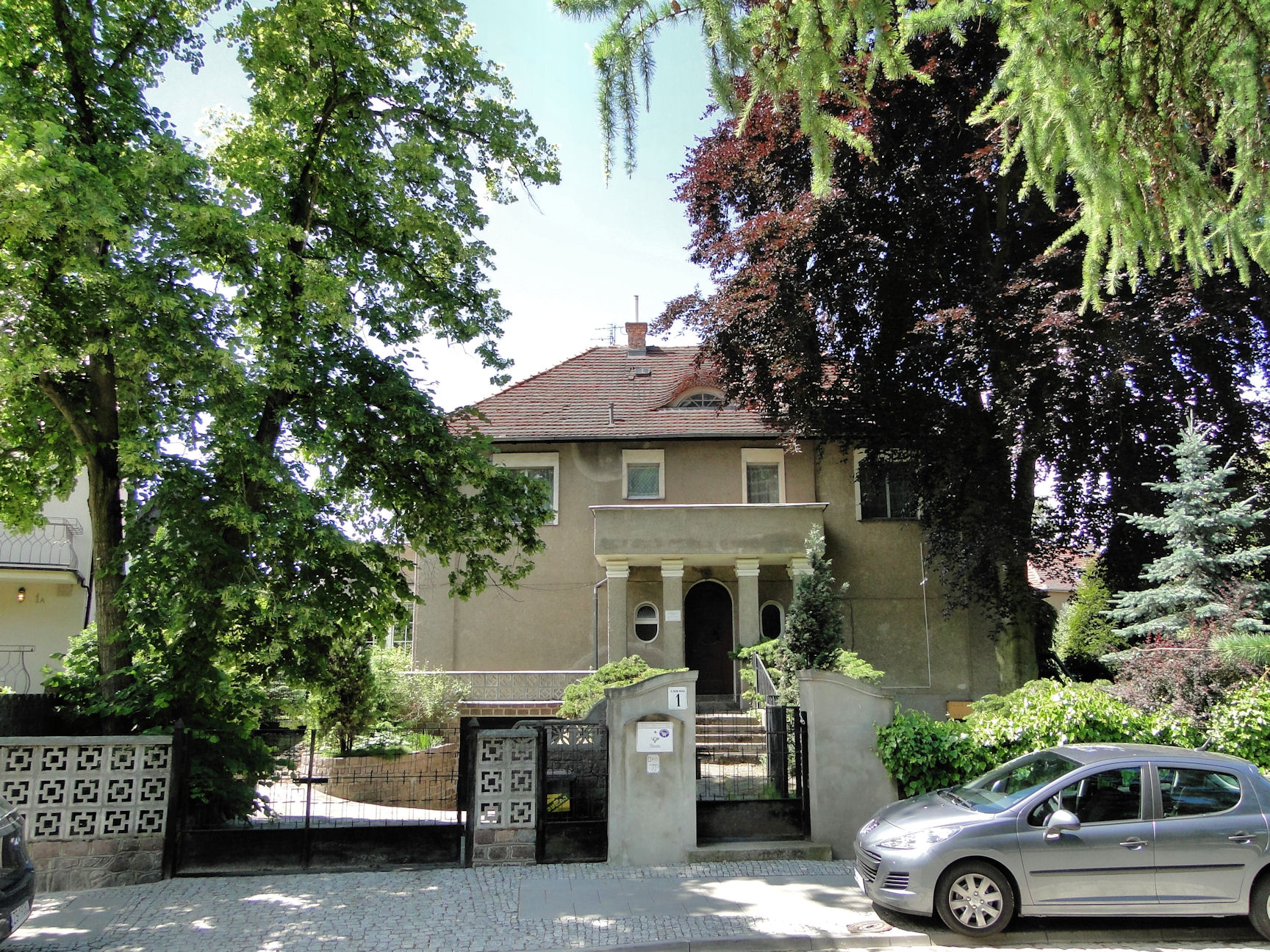
Villa at 1 Wujek Square.

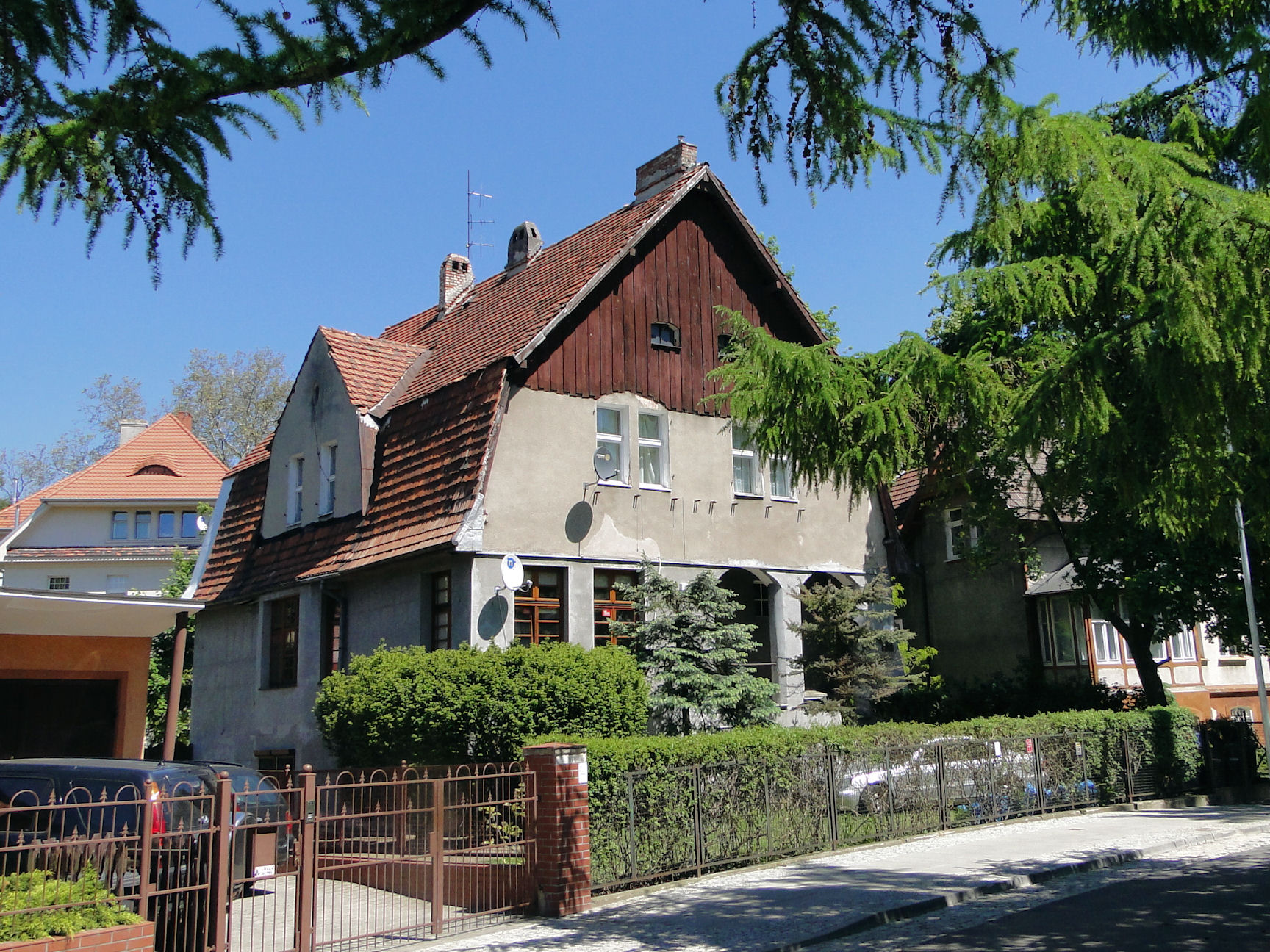
Villa at 4 Wujek Square.

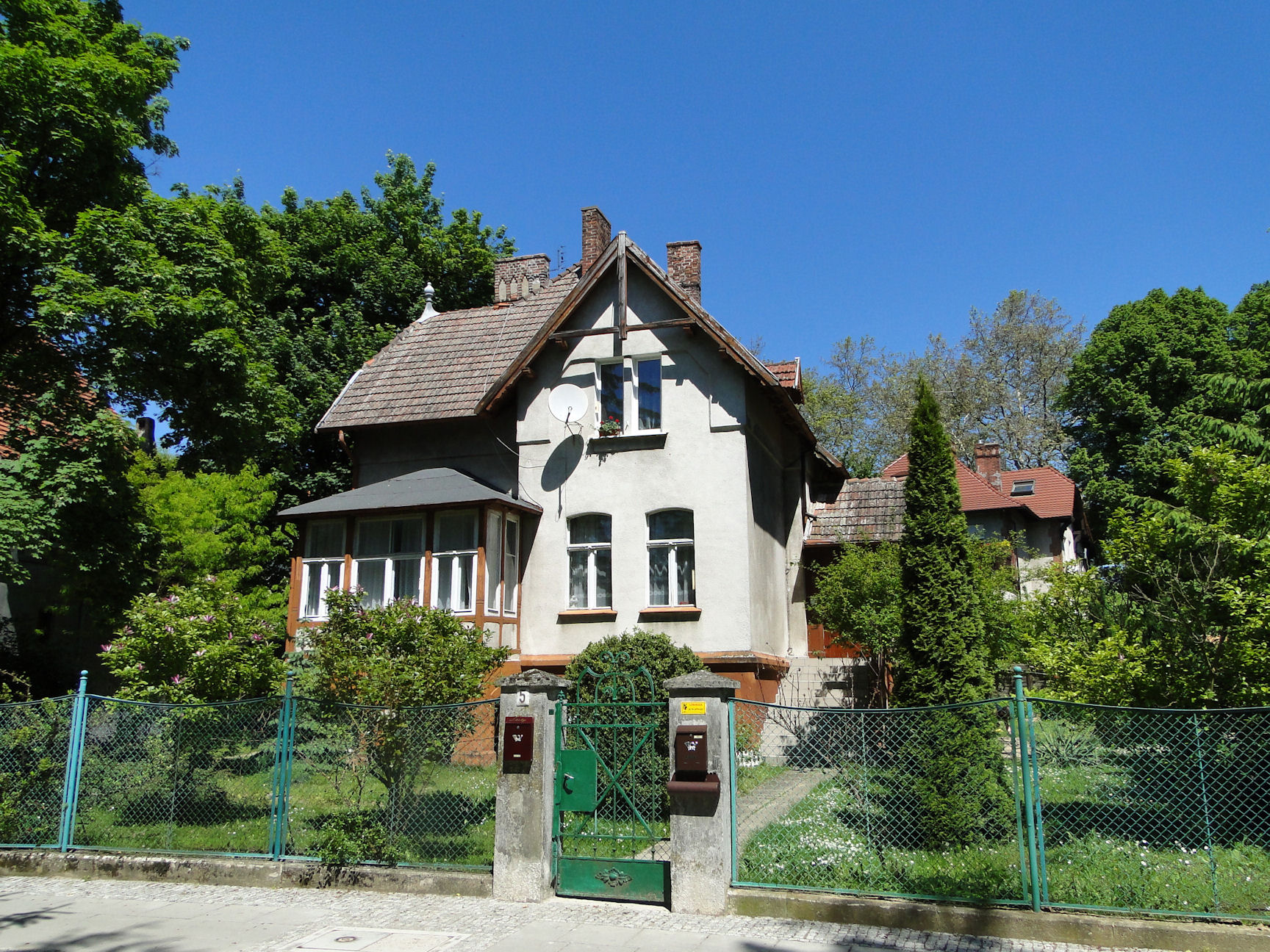
Villa at 5 Wujek Square.

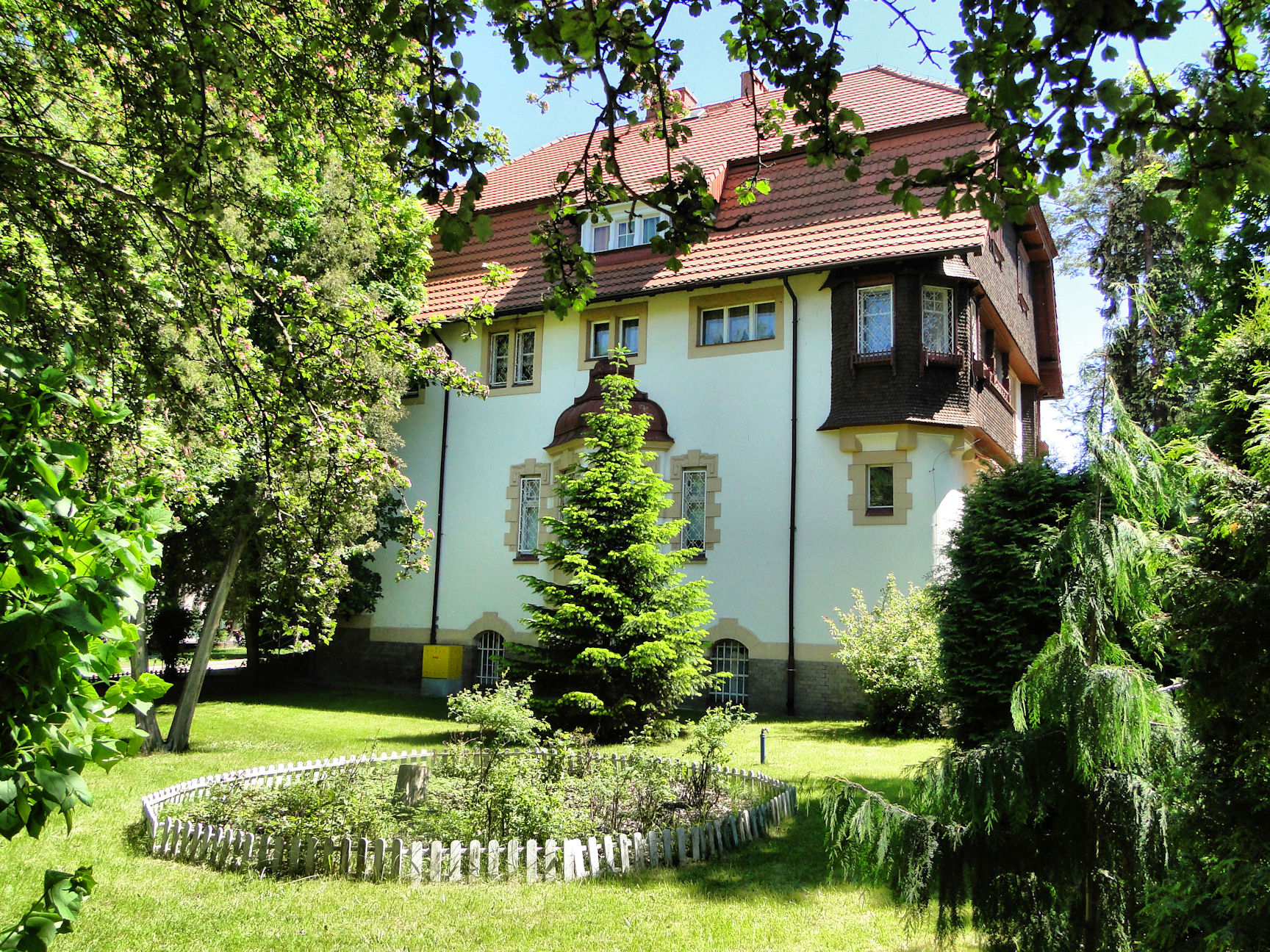
Villa at 6 Wujek Square.

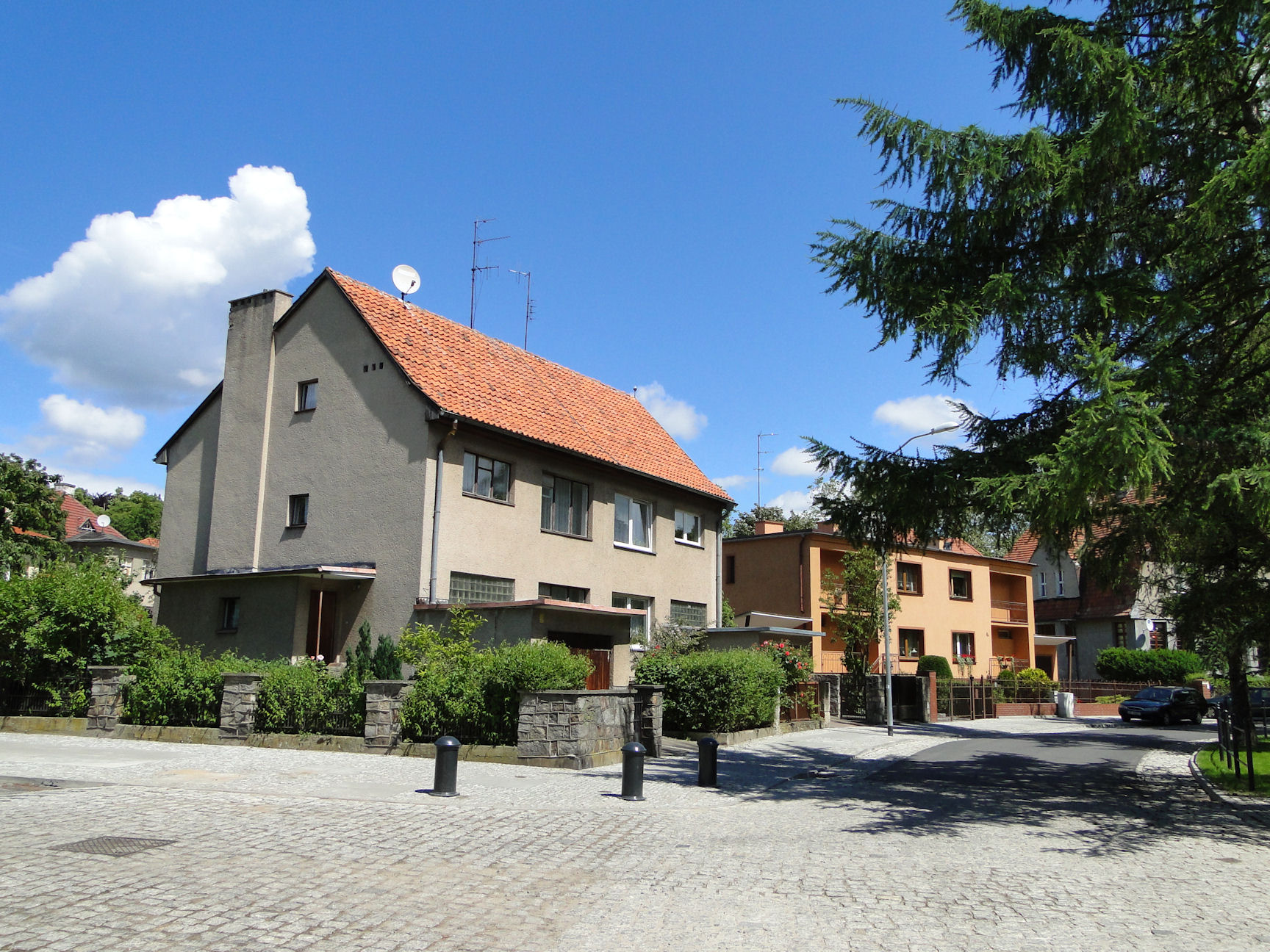
Modern houses at Wujek Square.
