= Słowieńsko, Szczecin =

Neighbourhood of Szczecin, Poland

Słowieńsko (known as Wendorf until 1945) is a part of Szczecin City, Poland situated on the left bank of the Oder river, west of the Szczecin Old Town and Middle Town.
