= Armada Szczecin =

Logo

General information
- Founded: 2019
- Folded: 2021
- Stadium: Witkiewicza Street Stadium
- Headquartered: Szczecin, Poland
- Colours: Blue and white

League / conference affiliations
- American Football League (2019): Second division; Polish Football League (2020–2021): Nine-man football division (2020–2019)

Championships
- Championship title: 1 Polish Football League nine-man football division: 2020

Armada Szczecin (Polish: [arˈma.da ˈʂt͡ʂɛ.t͡ɕin]) was an American football team based in the city of Szczecin, Poland, which participated in the American Football League in 2019, and in the Polish Football League from 2020 to 2021. The team was formed in 2019, from the merger Husaria Szczecin and Cougars Szczecin, and operated until 2021, when it was disbanded. It held the championship title in the 2020 season of the nine-man football division of the Polish Football League. It had its home filed on 69 Witkiewicza Street in Szczecin.

== History ==
The American football team Armada Szczecin was formed in January 2019, in a merger of teams Husaria Szczecin and Cougars Szczecin. It was based in the city of Szczecin, Poland, with its home filed located on 69 Witkiewicza Street. The team participated in the 2019 season of the 2nd division of the American Football League of Poland. Its club manager was Tomasz Leszczyński.

It was planned for Armada Szczecin to debut in the 1st division American Football League in the 2020 season, which however was cancelled due to the COVID-19 pandemic. Instead, the team participated in the nine-man football division of the Polish Football League, in which, it won the champion title. The team also participated in the 2021 season of the nine-man football conference, where it lost the finals to the Bielawa Owls.

Due to the financial difficulties, the team was disbanded in November 2021, following the end of the season.
