= Gręziniec =

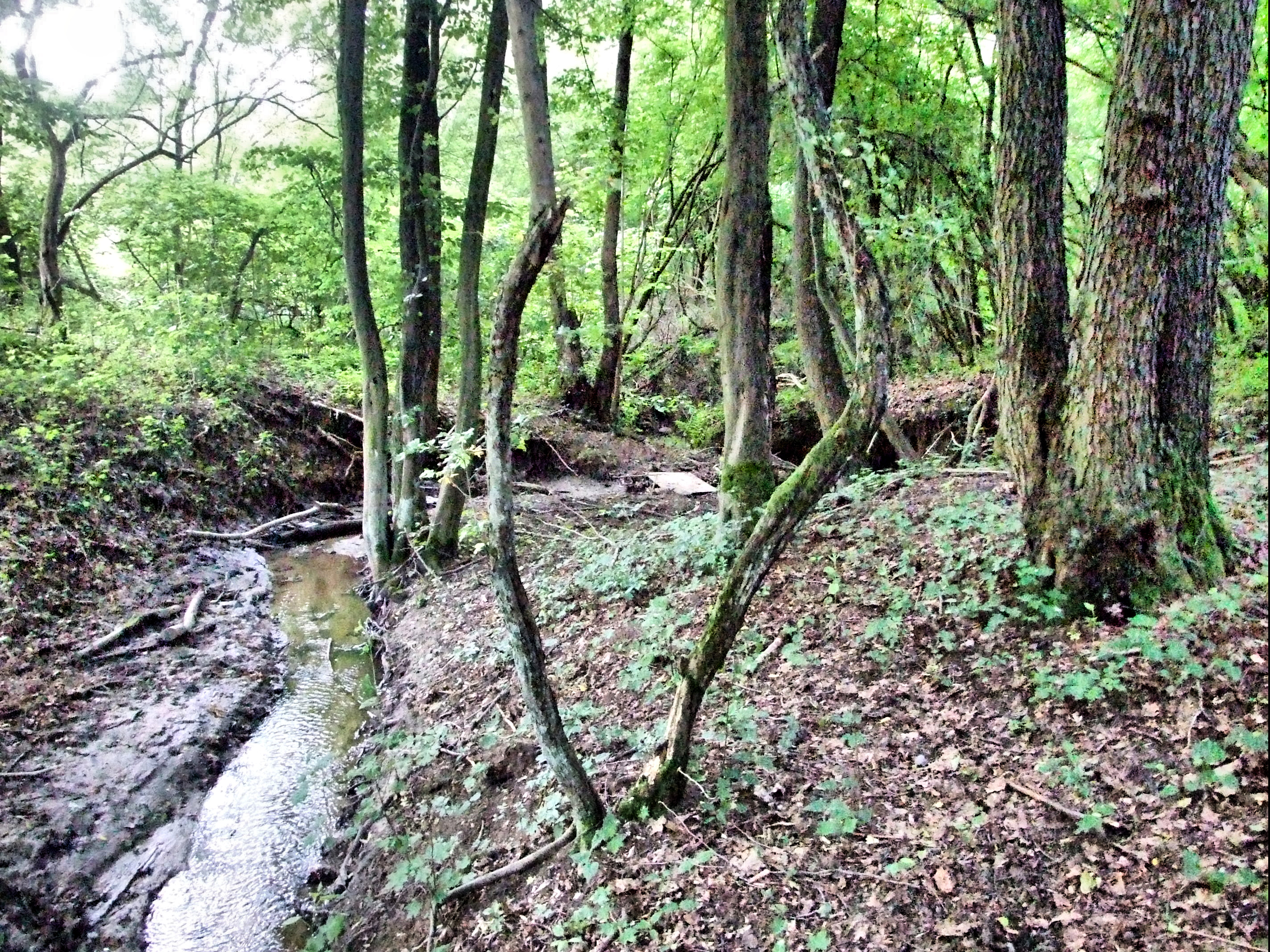
- Gręziniec near Górna St. in Szczecin

Location
- Country: Poland
- Voivodeship: West Pomeranian
- City county: Szczecin

Physical characteristics
- Source
  - location: north of Warszewo, Szczecin
  - coordinates: 53°29′41.0″N 14°23′17.0″E
- Mouth: Oder
  - location: Golęcino, Szczecin
  - coordinates: 53.4589°N 14.5944°E
- Length: 5.5 km (3.4 mi)

Basin features
- Progression: Oder→ Baltic Sea
- Tributaries
  - right: Sienniczka

Gręziniec (also Grzęziniec) is a 5.5-km river of northwestern Poland, with its headwaters in the Ueckermünde Heath. It flows through the city of Szczecin and joins the Oder from the left bank.
