= Sienniczka =

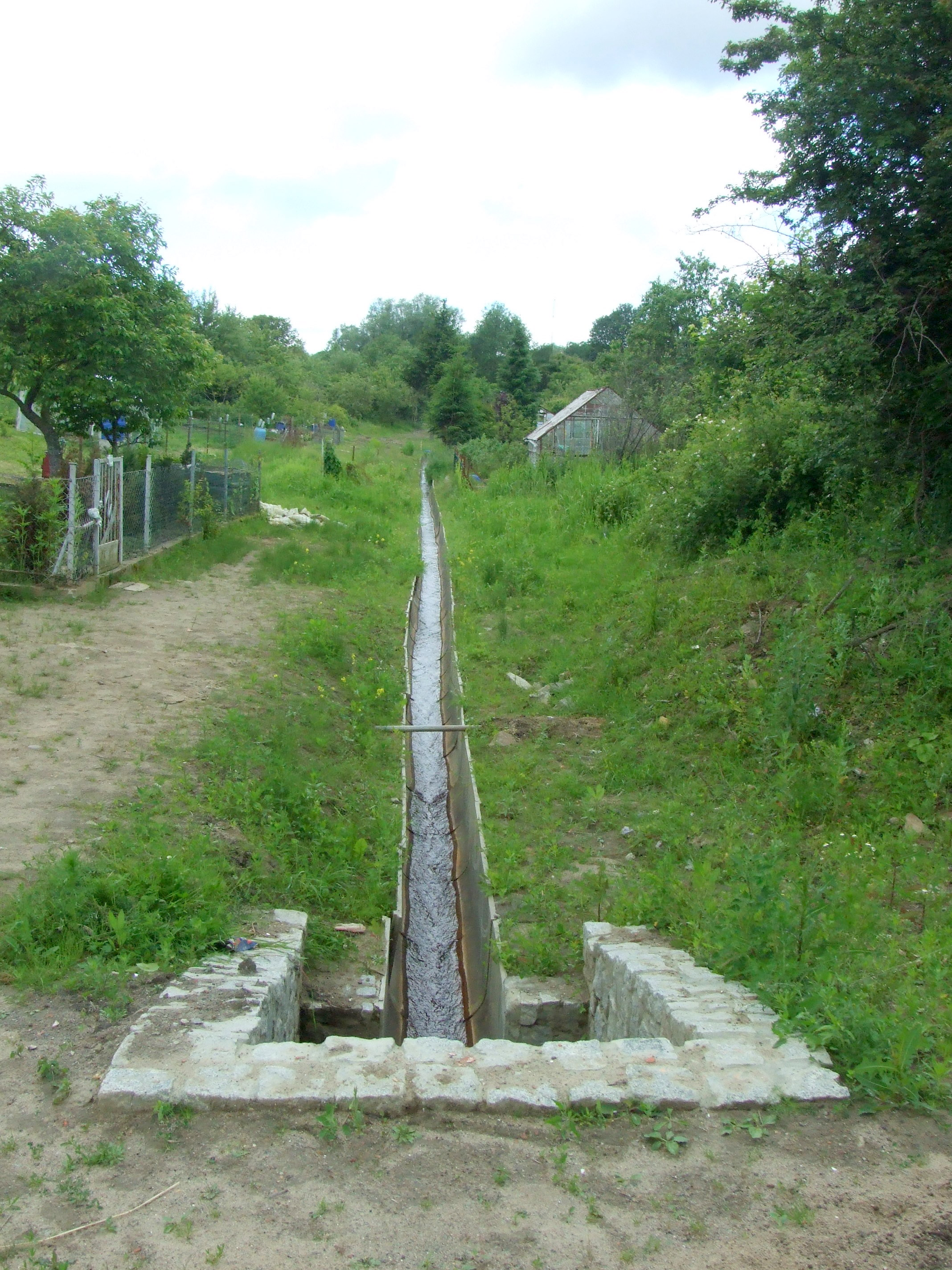
- The Sienniczka along a row of allotments in the Żelechowa neighborhood

Location
- Country: Poland
- Voivodeship: West Pomeranian
- City county: Szczecin

Physical characteristics
- Source
  - location: Warszewo, Szczecin
  - coordinates: 53°29′02″N 14°33′21″E
- Mouth: Gręziniec
  - location: southern portion of Bukowo, Szczecin
  - coordinates: 53.4736°N 14.5770°E
- Length: 1.5 km (0.93 mi)

Basin features
- Progression: Gręziniec→ Oder→ Baltic Sea

Sienniczka is a short 1.5-kilometer river of Poland, a tributary of the Gręziniec near Szczecin.
