= Kungsparken =

Kungsparken (Swedish for "King's park") may refer to:

- Kungsparken, Gothenburg, a park in Gothenburg, Sweden
- Kungsparken, Malmö, a park in Malmö, Sweden

== See also ==
- Kings Park (disambiguation)
