= Bältespännarparken =

Park in Gothenburg, Sweden

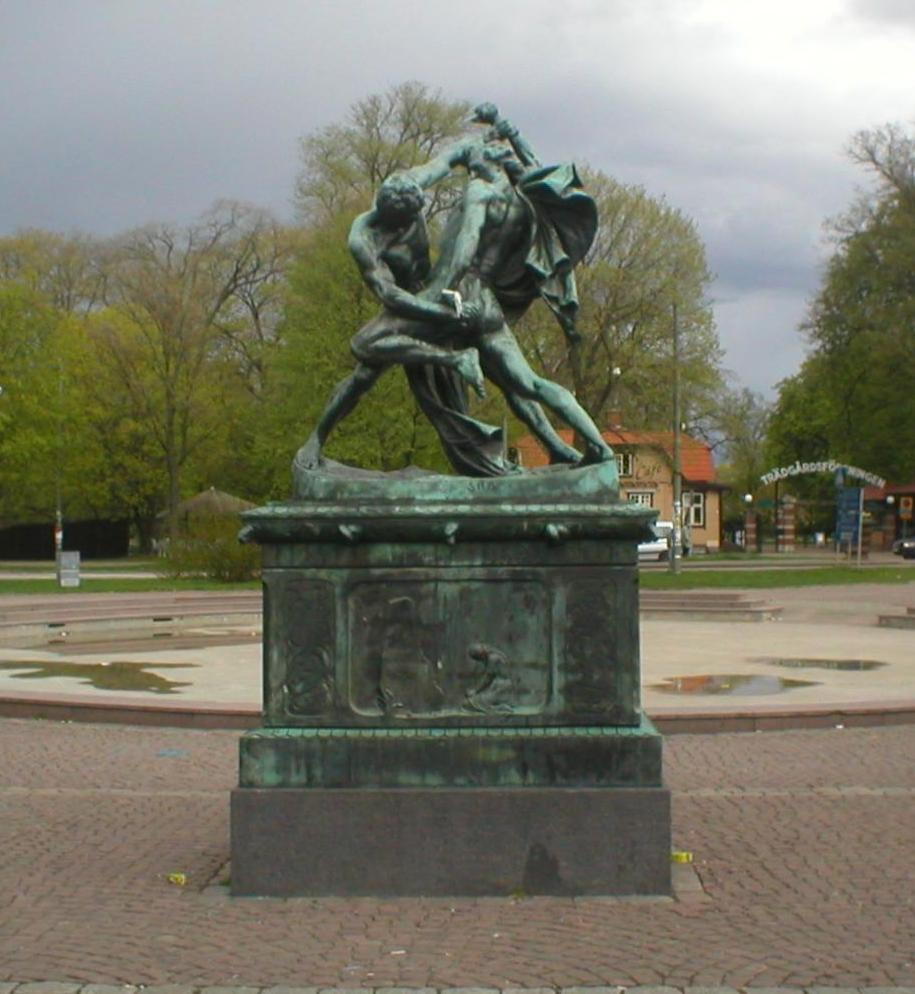
- Bältespännarna statue viewed from Avenyn toward the entrance of the Garden Society of Gothenburg
- Interactive map of Bältespännarparken
- Type: Urban park
- Location: Kungsparken, Gothenburg, Sweden
- Coordinates: 57°42′30″N 11°58′22″E
- Area: 6,000 m²
- Operator: Gothenburg Municipality
- Open: Open all year

Bältespännarparken (Swedish: [ˈbɛ̂ltɛˌspɛnːarpaɾkɛn] ('The Belt Bucklers Park') is a section of Kungsparken in central Gothenburg, Sweden. It is located directly across from the Stora Teatern at the intersection of Kungsportsavenyen and the main entrance to the Garden Society of Gothenburg, and takes its unofficial name from a sculpture located there.

== History ==
The section of Kungsparken was unofficially named in 2003 after the sculpture Bältespännarna by Johan Peter Molin, one of several versions of a depiction of two ancient Scandinavian warriors belted together in single combat, which was originally installed in the area on 15 May 1863 and relocated to its current position in 1914.

The park is part of the larger, contiguous green space that surrounds the Vallgraven moat, created following the demolition of Gothenburg's fortifications in the early 19th century.

== Features ==
Since the late 1980s, the park featured a small circular pond that functioned as a fountain in summer and a man-made ice rink in winter. Due to its corporate sponsorship, the pond was colloquially known as "Sponsringen" (The Sponsorship).

In 2013, Bältespännarparken underwent renovations including a new fountain with a bowl-shaped design, the planting of cherry trees, and installation of park benches. The stone rim of the old pond was removed, and the previous roadway of Södra Vägen between the park and the Garden Society was replaced with a footpath, bicycle path, and gravel area.
