= Niso Fumagalli Rose Garden =

Rose garden in Monza, Italy

Coordinates: 45.3537°N 9.1620°E

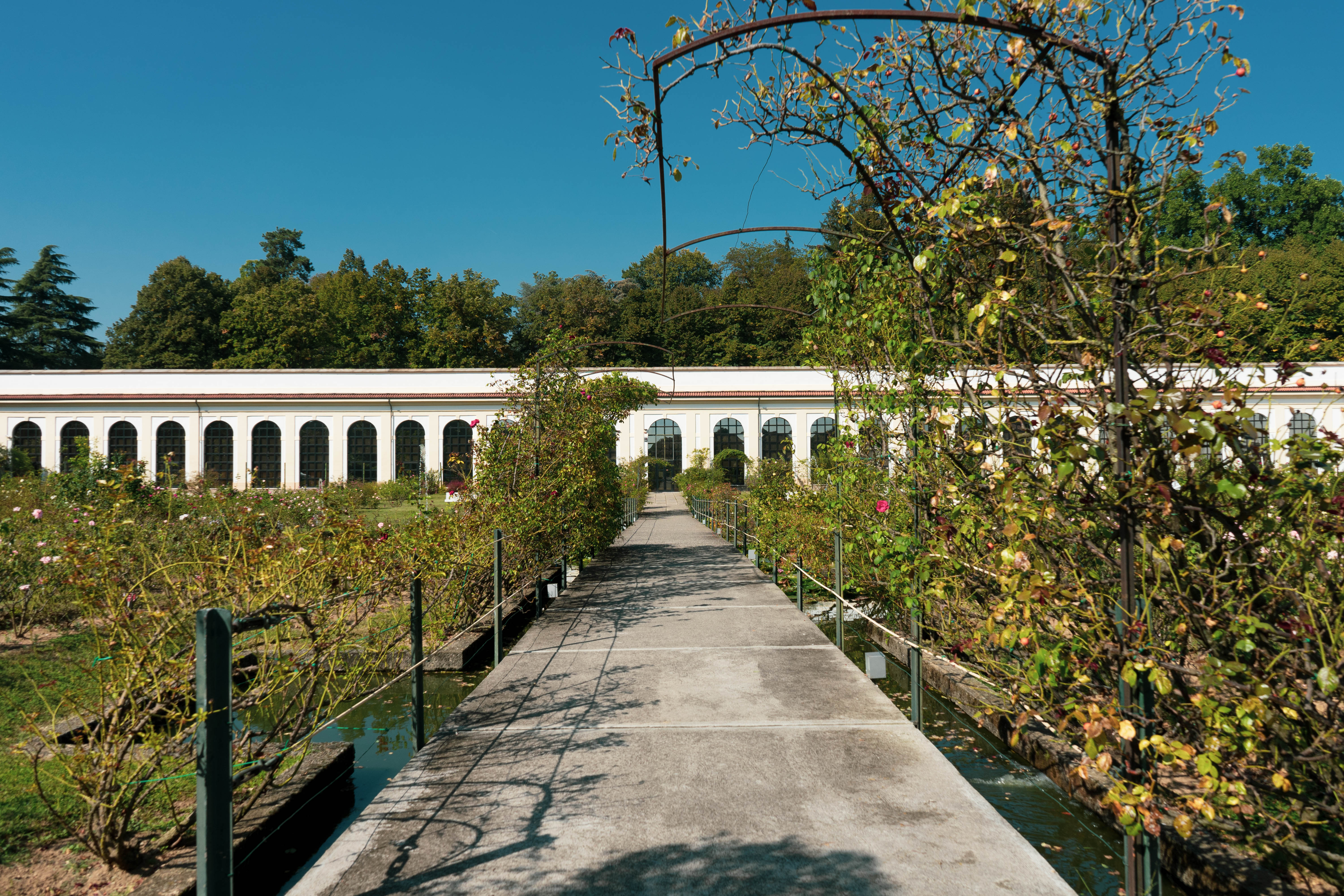
Niso Fumagalli Rose Garden

Niso Fumagalli Rose Garden, in Italian: Roseto Niso Fumagalli, is a public garden in Monza, Italy, located within the complex of the Palace of Monza, in front of the Orangerie. The garden was established in 1964. Over 4000 varieties of roses are grown there, many of them gifts from countries around the world. On 21 May 2004, on the occasion of the 40th edition of the International Competitions for New Roses in Monza, the Monza Rose Garden was awarded by the then Vice President for Europe of the World Federation of Rose Societies, Maurice Jay, of the highly coveted "Award of Garden Excellence". The rose garden also has an experimental section where new varieties of roses are tested for their suitability for public and private gardens in Italy.

== History ==
Monza Rose Garden was established in 1964 by decision of Niso Fumagalli, industrialist and owner of Candy, who the previous year had founded the Italian Rose Association, of which he was president until his death in 1990. The land, within the domain of the Royal Villa of Monza, was made available by the municipality. Already in September 1965, during the construction phase, the first competitions were announced to elect, including "rose of the year", that of the "most beautiful Italian rose" and the most important, that of the "scented rose ", which was won by the Dutch Jan Leenders, who named his flower "Monza". In the early 90s, thanks to the collaboration with Anna Furlani Pedoja, landscape designer and advisor to the Italian Rose Association, other landscape elements were introduced into the rose garden in order to further enhance the rose garden.

== Description ==
Niso Fumagalli Rose Garden was designed by the famous architects Francesco Clerici and Vittorio Faglia, who, through slightly undulating terrain, a pond, and paths designed for the public, tried to harmoniously insert it into the surrounding context. It consists largely of modern roses, but there is also a collection of ancient varieties, arranged along the gate, on the arch of the gazebo, on the walkway that crosses the pond and along the privet hedges. There is also a section dedicated to Domenico Aicardi and Febo Giuseppe Cazzaniga, among the oldest and most famous Italian rose growers, with a collection of some of their most famous roses, kindly donated to the Monza Rose Garden by Professor Gianfranco Fineschi. In a specially dedicated area of the rose garden, a collection called "Queens of Europe" was created more recently, of the rose varieties most awarded each year in numerous European competitions.

The rose garden is open free of charge in conjunction with the exhibitions that are organized at the Orangerie of the Royal Villa of Monza.

== See also ==
- Rose garden
- Royal Villa of Monza
