= Rose garden =

Garden or park which consists mainly of roses

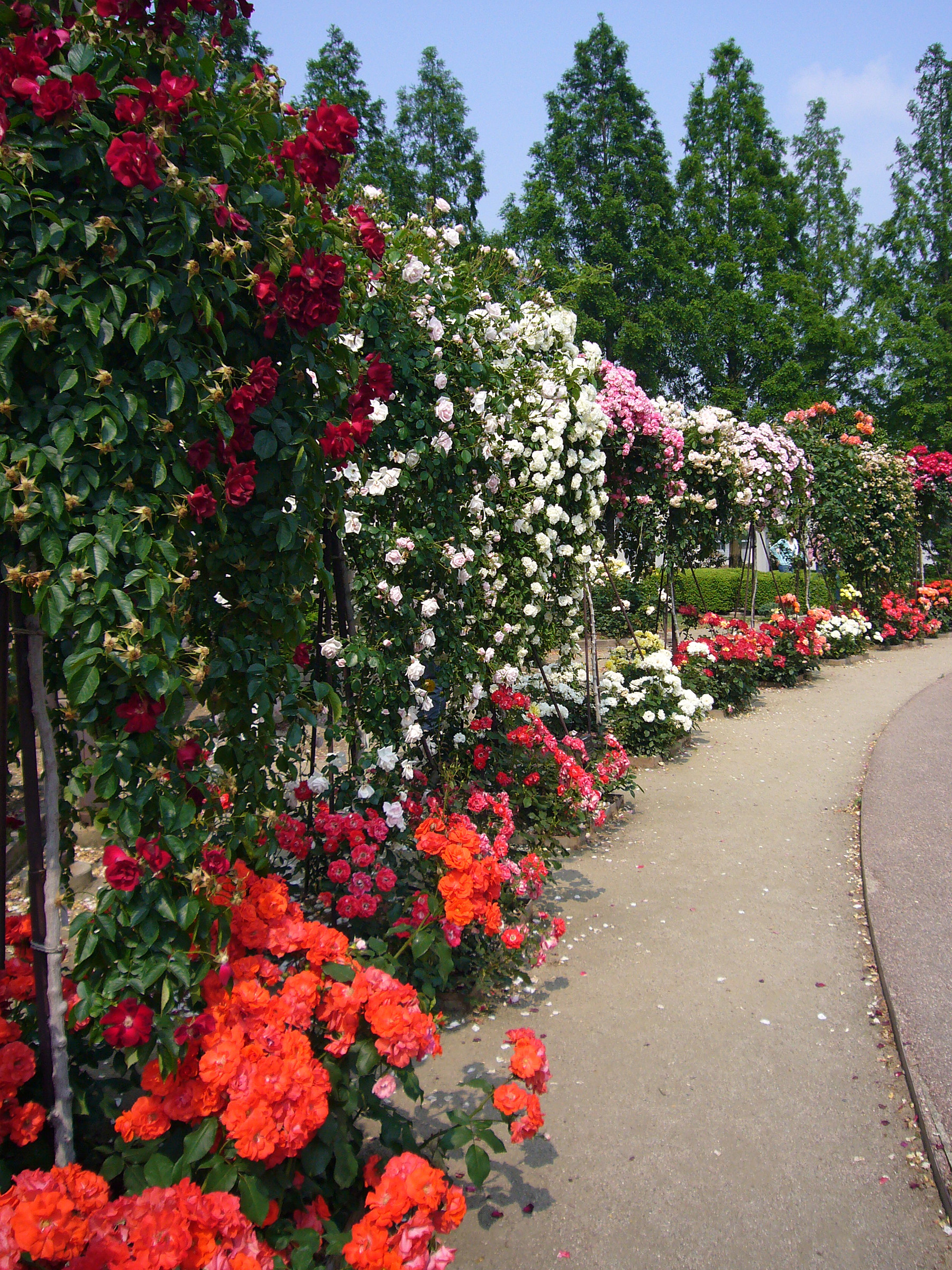
Aramaki rose park, Hyōgo Prefecture, Japan

A rose garden or rosarium is a garden or park, often open to the public, used to present and grow various types of garden roses, and sometimes rose species. Designs vary tremendously and roses may be displayed alongside other plants or grouped by individual variety, colour or class in rose beds. Technically it is a specialized type of shrub garden, but normally treated as a type of flower garden, if only because its origins in Europe go back to at least the Middle Ages in Europe, when roses were effectively the largest and most popular flowers, already existing in numerous garden cultivars.

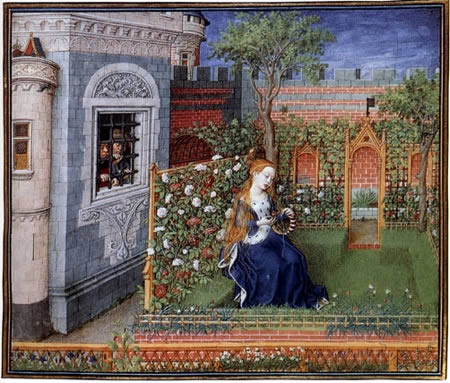
Emilia in the rosegarden, Anjou, ~1460

== Origins of the rose garden ==
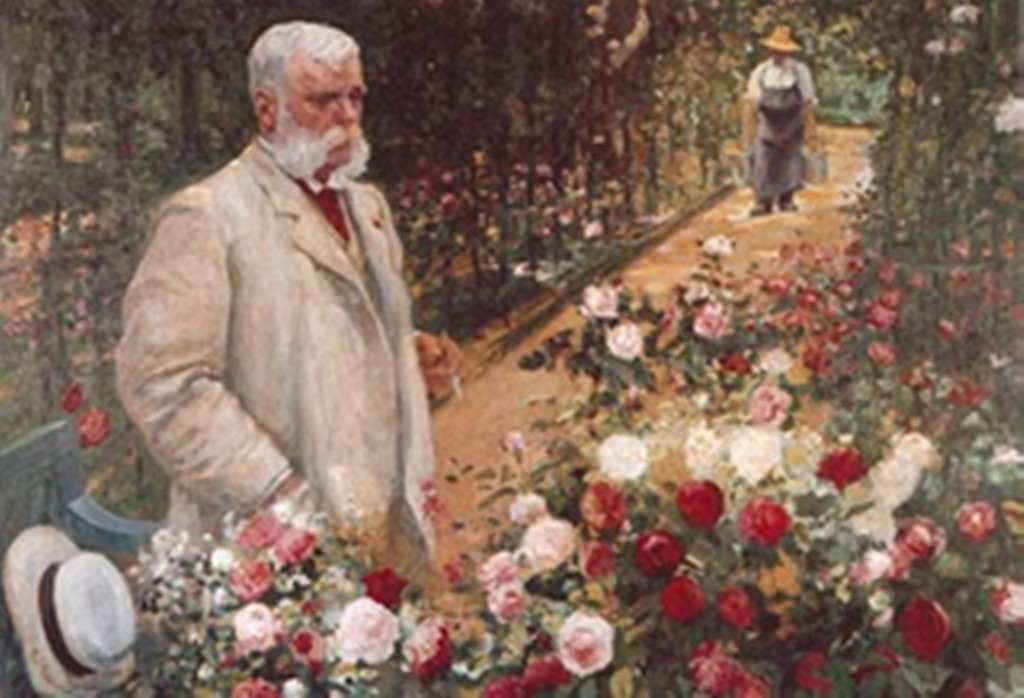
Jules Gravereaux in Roseraie du Val-de-Marne, 1900

Of the over 150 species of rose, the Chinese Rosa chinensis has contributed most to today's garden roses; it has been bred into garden varieties for about 1,000 years in China, and over 200 in Europe. It is believed that roses were grown in many of the early civilisations in temperate latitudes from at least 5000 years ago. They are known to have been grown in ancient Babylon. Paintings of roses have been discovered in Egyptian pyramid tombs from the 14th century BC. Records exist of them being grown in Chinese gardens and Greek gardens from at least 500 BC. The 13th-century Persian Sufi mystic and poet Rumi spoke of rose gardens in his poetry.

Many of the original plant breeders used roses as a starting material as it is a quick way to obtain results. Most of the plants grown in these early gardens are likely to have been species collected from the wild. However, there were large numbers of selected varieties being grown from early times; for instance numerous selections or cultivars of the China rose were in cultivation in China in the first millennium AD.

The significant breeding of modern times started slowly in Europe from about the 17th century. This was encouraged by the introduction of new species, and especially by the introduction of the China rose into Europe in the 19th century. An enormous range of roses has been bred since then. A major contributor in the early 19th century was Empress Josephine of France, who patronized the development of rose breeding at her gardens at Malmaison. As long ago as 1840, a collection numbering over one thousand different cultivars, varieties and species was possible when a rosarium was planted by Loddiges nursery for Abney Park Cemetery, an early Victorian garden cemetery and arboretum in England.

British designers of rose gardens include Thomas Mawson, who created examples at Graythwaite Hall (his first major garden project in 1886) and other sites, including Bushey (1913). Another surviving old public rose garden is Jules Gravereaux's Roseraie du Val-de-Marne south of Paris in L'Haÿ-les-Roses, which was laid out in 1899 and remains the biggest rose garden in France.

== List of public rose gardens ==
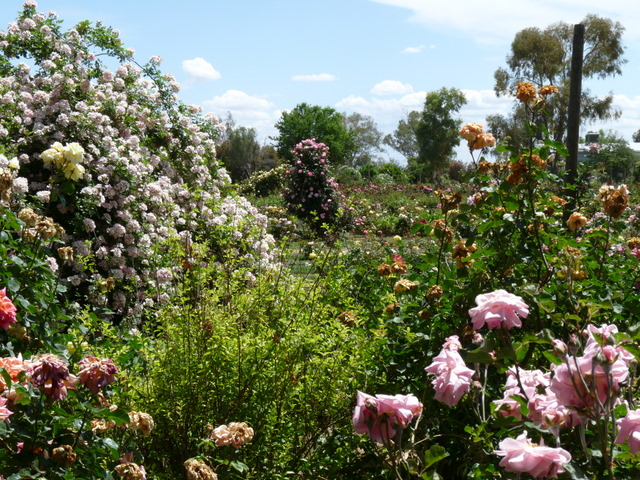
Ruston's Roses in South Australia

Public rose gardens are a feature of many towns and cities. Since 1995, the World Federation of Rose Societies (WFRS) grants the Award of Garden Excellence. So far, 42 gardens have been selected. Notable gardens around the world include:

=== Argentina ===
- Rosedal de Palermo in the Parc 3 de Febrero in Buenos Aires was created in 1912 and restored from 1994 to 2008. It was granted the Award of Garden Excellence in 2012.

=== Austria ===
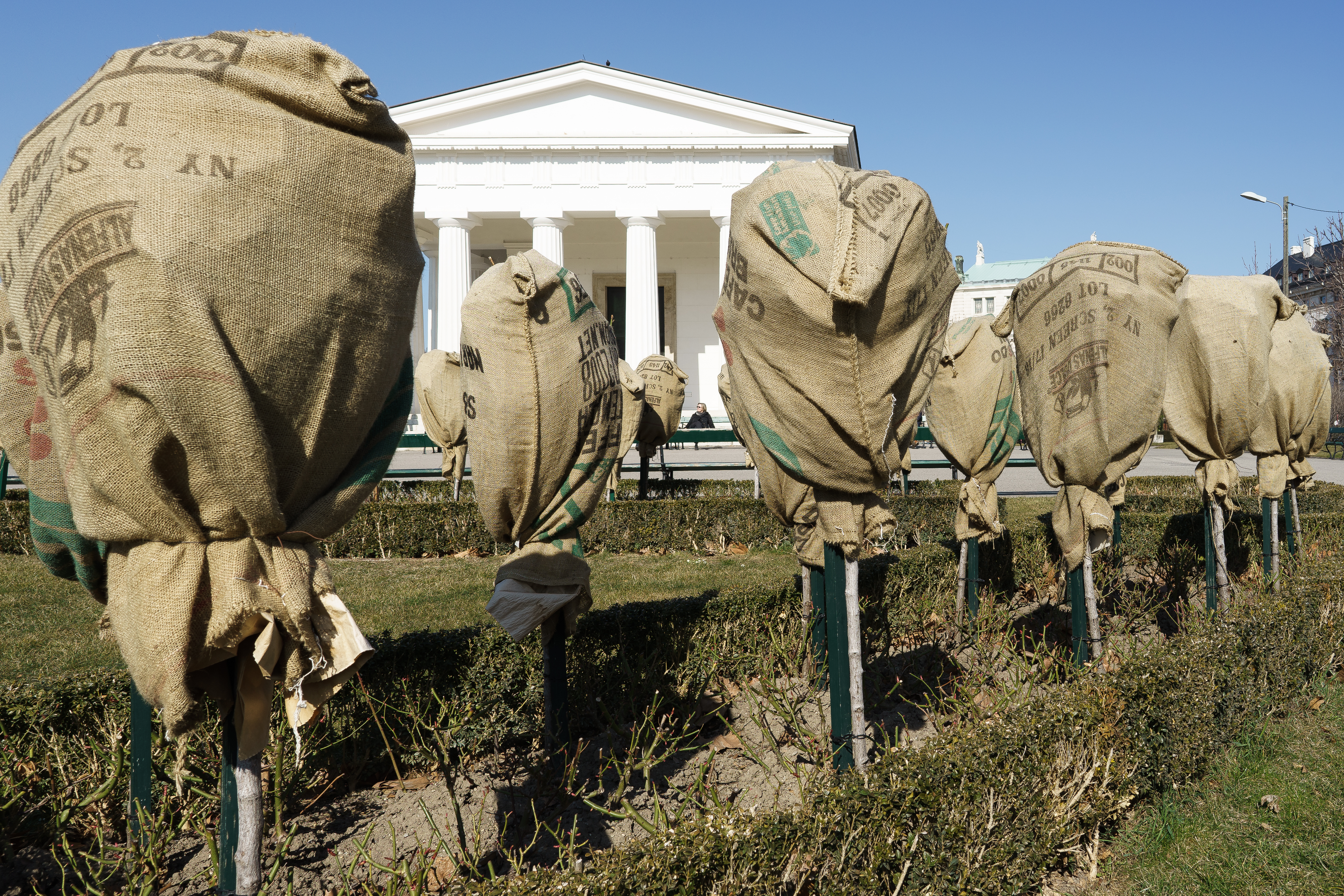
Roses with protection against freezing – Volksgarten, Vienna

- Volksgarten, Vienna. A public park in the heart of Austria's capital, famous for its beautiful rose gardens with over 3,000 plants of more than 200 different cultivars of roses.

=== Australia ===
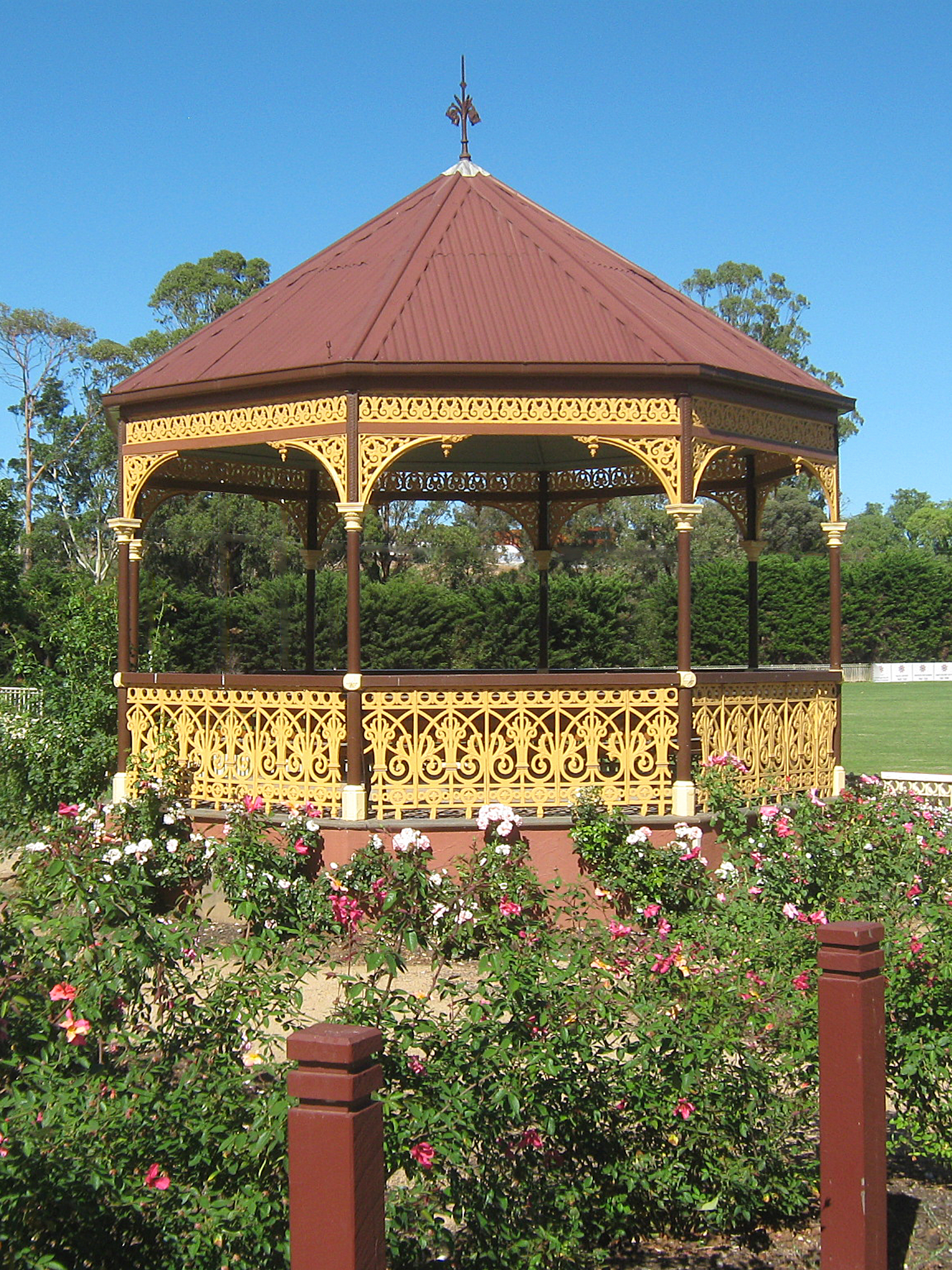
1905 Dickie bandstand in Nieuwesteeg Heritage Rose Garden, Bacchus Marsch, Victoria

- Ruston's Roses in Renmark, South Australia houses the National Rose Collection of Australia (since 2005) and displays more than 4,000 modern and old garden varieties. The garden, which started life as a commercial fruit orchard, began supplying the cut flower trade and by the mid-1970s it focused entirely on supplying roses as both cut flowers and garden plants.
- Alister Clark Memorial Rose Garden, a rose garden in Bulla, Victoria, home town of the rosarian Alister Clark, containing all his surviving cultivars.
- Morwell Centenary Rose Garden in Morwell, Victoria, with over 4000 rose plants on an area of 4 acres (1.6 ha) and a focus on rose breeders from Australia and New Zealand, both historical and modern. The WFRS granted the Award of Garden Excellence in 2009.
- Victoria State Rose Garden in Werribee, Victoria, with an extravagant garden design, where most rose beds are part of bigger features such as The Tudor Rose, The Federation Leaf, The Heritage Perimeter Garden and The David Austin Bud. It was granted the Award of Garden Excellence in 2003.
- Nieuwesteeg Heritage Rose Garden in Bacchus Marsh, Victoria.

=== Belgium ===
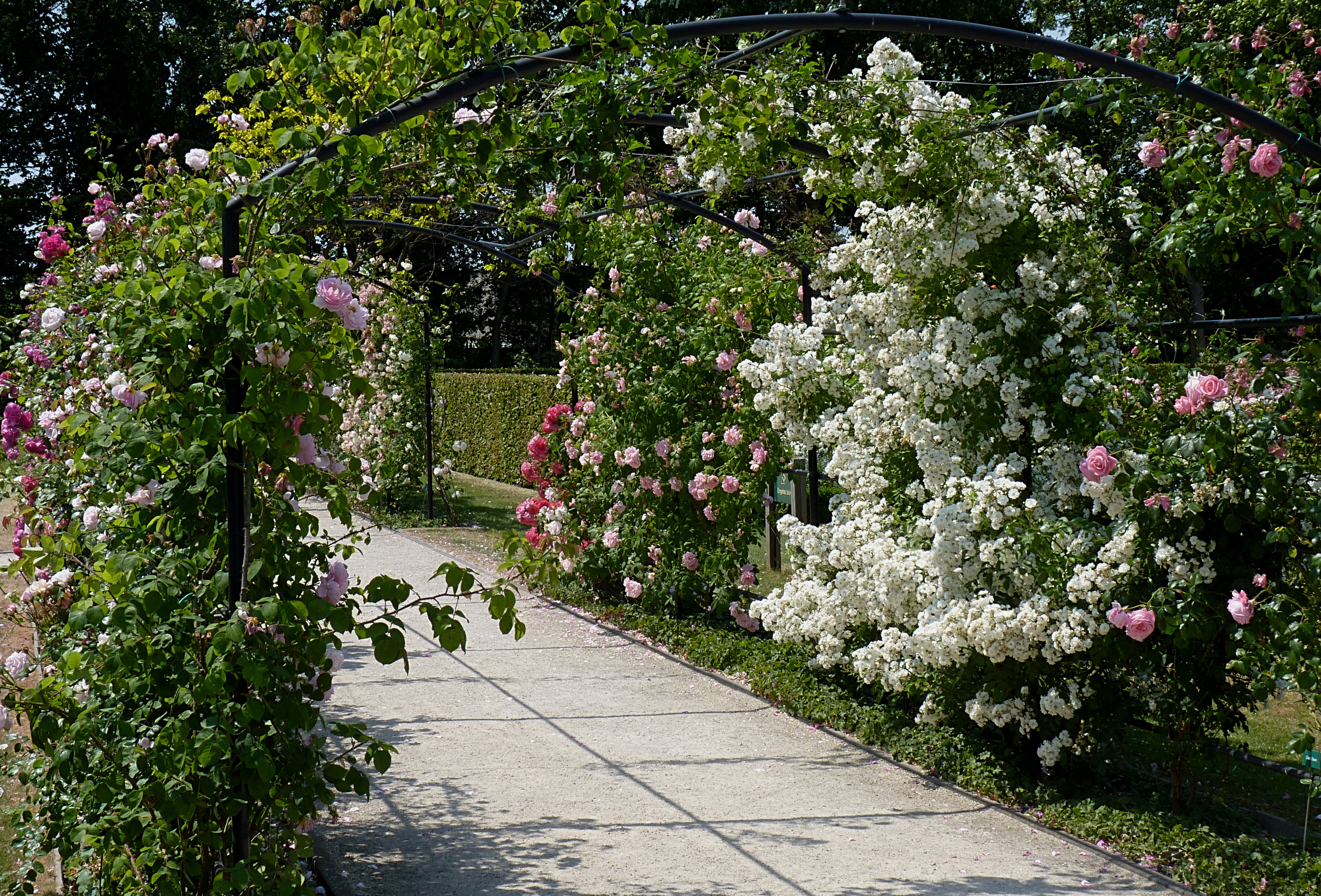
International rose garden of Kortrijk, Belgium

- Coloma Castle, in Sint-Pieters-Leeuw, six miles (10 km) south of Brussels has more than 60,000 rose plants of some 3,000 different varieties. These include a complete collection of Belgian-raised roses and an area devoted to historic roses. The largest rose garden features varieties grouped by country and by breeder.
- The Garden of Roses at Hex Castle at Kasteel Hex, containing an exceptional assortment of about 250 varieties in a restored formal Renaissance garden originally laid out in 1770. It was the first rose garden in Belgium to be granted the WFRS's Award of Garden Excellence in 1998.
- The International rose garden of Kortrijk in Kortrijk, West Flanders, on the grounds of Castle t Hooghe was redesigned in 2003/2004 after 45 years of existence. The garden has three sections: a garden presenting commercially available modern rose cultivars from around the world, a collection of historic and wild roses and an international trials garden. In 2012, it was granted the WFRS's Award of Garden Excellence.
- The Rose Garden at Vrijbroek Park in Mechelen consists of three rose gardens in a landscape park designed in the 19th century. The oldest is a formal rose garden, followed by a rose garden showcasing the history of the rose opened in 1994, and a garden presenting the wild roses of Belgium. In 2003, it was granted the Award of Garden Excellence by the World Federation of Rose Societies.

=== Canada ===
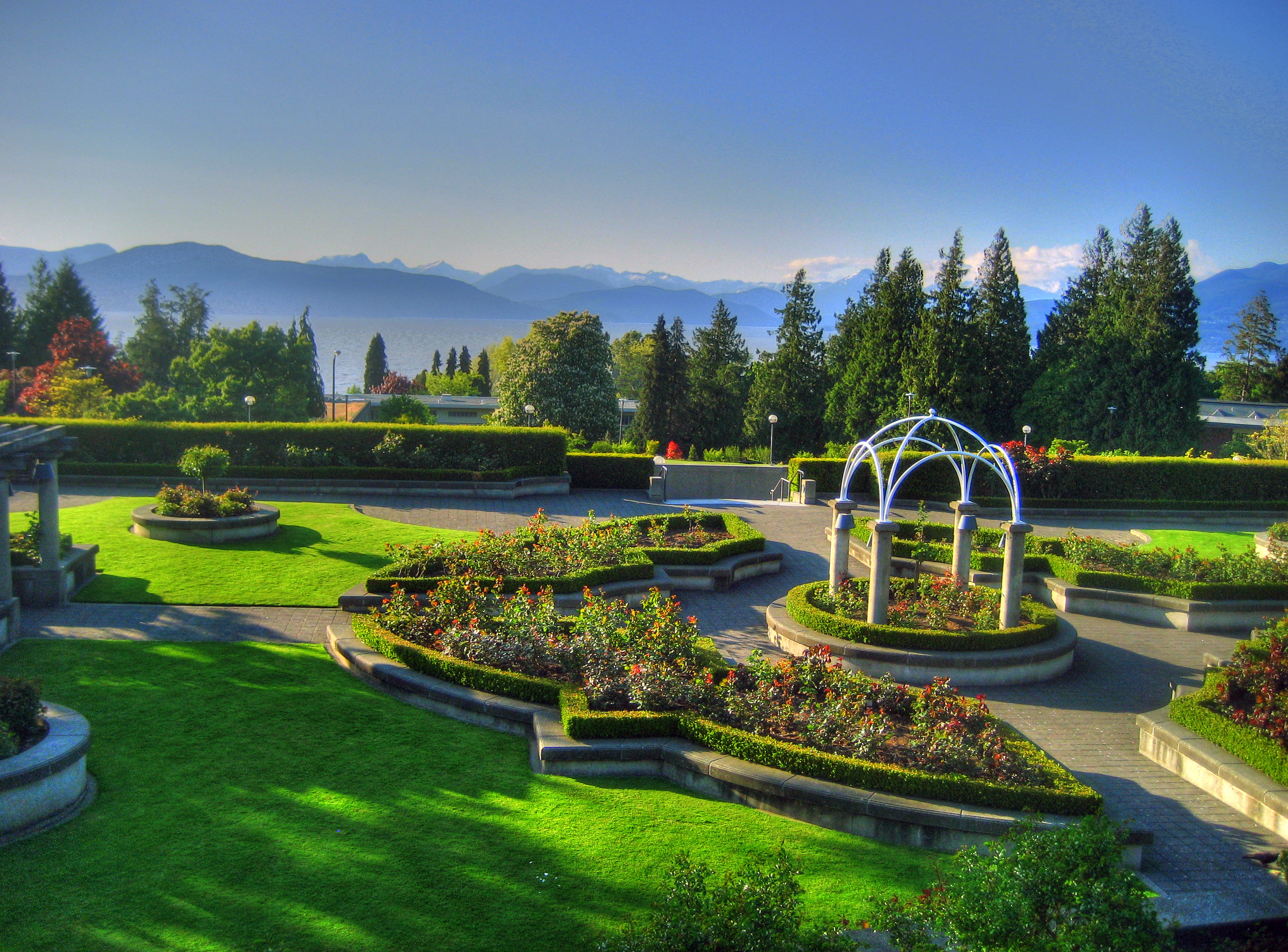
University of British Columbia Rose Garden

- The Rose Garden at the Montreal Botanical Garden has a collection of 10,000 roses in a modern rose garden with winding beds. It has an older section with modern varieties, needing a lot of winter protection to survive the Canadian climate, and a newer section with species, historic roses and hardy modern roses. It was granted the WFRS's Award of Garden Excellence in 2003.
- Canadian Heritage Garden, or Rideau Hall’s rose garden, at Rideau Hall, Ottawa, boasts over 200 varieties of winter-hardy roses.
- Royal Botanical Gardens, Ontario has a Centennial Rose Garden in its Hamilton complex. Laid out in 1967, it features Floribunda and Hybrid Tea roses, as well as collections of old varieties.
- The University of British Columbia, Vancouver has a Rose Garden with Ocean and Mountain background views.

=== China ===
- Shenzhen Renmin Park in Shenzhen, Guangdong, in Southern China is a rose garden created in 2002. The garden hosts some 10 000 rose plants in a very humid climate. Most notable in the collection are the 23 ancient Chinese roses and the miniature roses grafted on species roses. The garden was granted the WFRS's Award of Garden Excellence in 2009.
- Zijing Park in Changzhou contains about 25 000 plants in over 1200 varieties and was distinguished with the WFRS's Award of Garden Excellence in 2012.

=== Denmark ===
- Gerlev Rosenpark near Frederikssund includes a large collection of historic roses and a complete inventory of roses bred by Poulsen, displayed according to the year they were introduced.

=== France ===
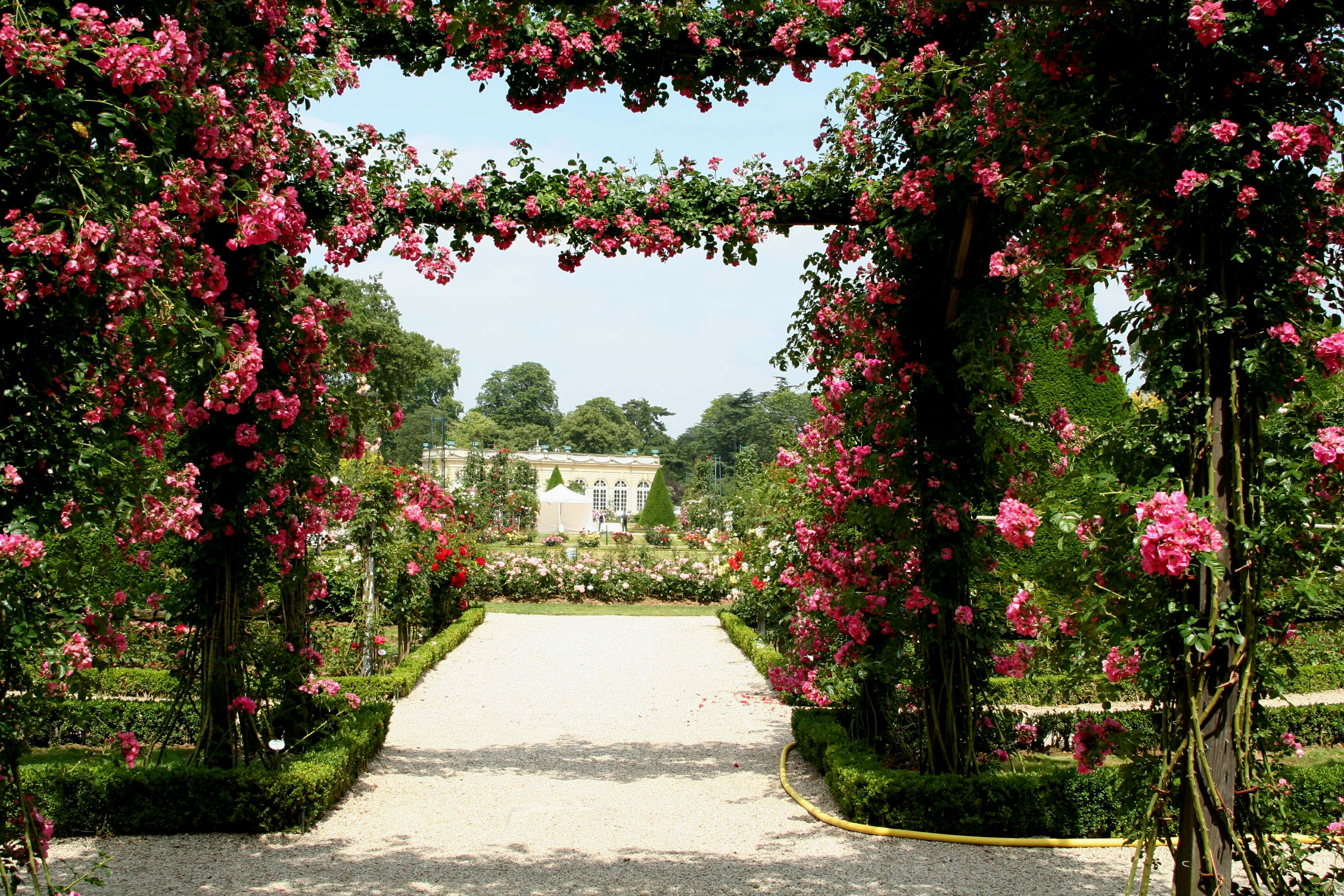
Parc de Bagatelle in Paris

- Roseraie du Val-de-Marne, L'Haÿ-les-Roses, is in the southern suburbs of Paris and was laid out in 1899 for the businessman Jules Gravereaux. By 1914 the gardens had become so famous that the commune of L'Haÿ was renamed L'Haÿ-les-Roses. Like Malmaison, the garden was built with the intention of displaying every rose in the world, and in the early years of the 20th century it contained 7,000 rose cultivars. Today it has around 2,000 species and 3,000 cultivars. It was the first garden to be granted the WFRS's Award of Garden Excellence in 1995.
- Parc de Bagatelle, in Paris was the brainchild of Commissioner of Gardens for Paris Jean-Claude Forestier, who created a classic rosegarden in strict geometric style between 1905 and 1907. Today, the park contains more than 9,000 modern roses of over 1,000 varieties in two rose gardens – the classic rose garden and a landscape rosegarden (roseraie de paysage). The first international competition for roses was organised here in 1907 and has been held annually ever since. It was granted the WFRS's Award of Garden Excellence in 2007.
- Parc de la Tête d'Or in Lyon was opened in 1964 in the city where modern rose hybridisation began. It contains four rose gardens, as well as trial grounds for new French varieties. It was granted the WFRS's Award of Garden Excellence in 2006.

=== Germany ===
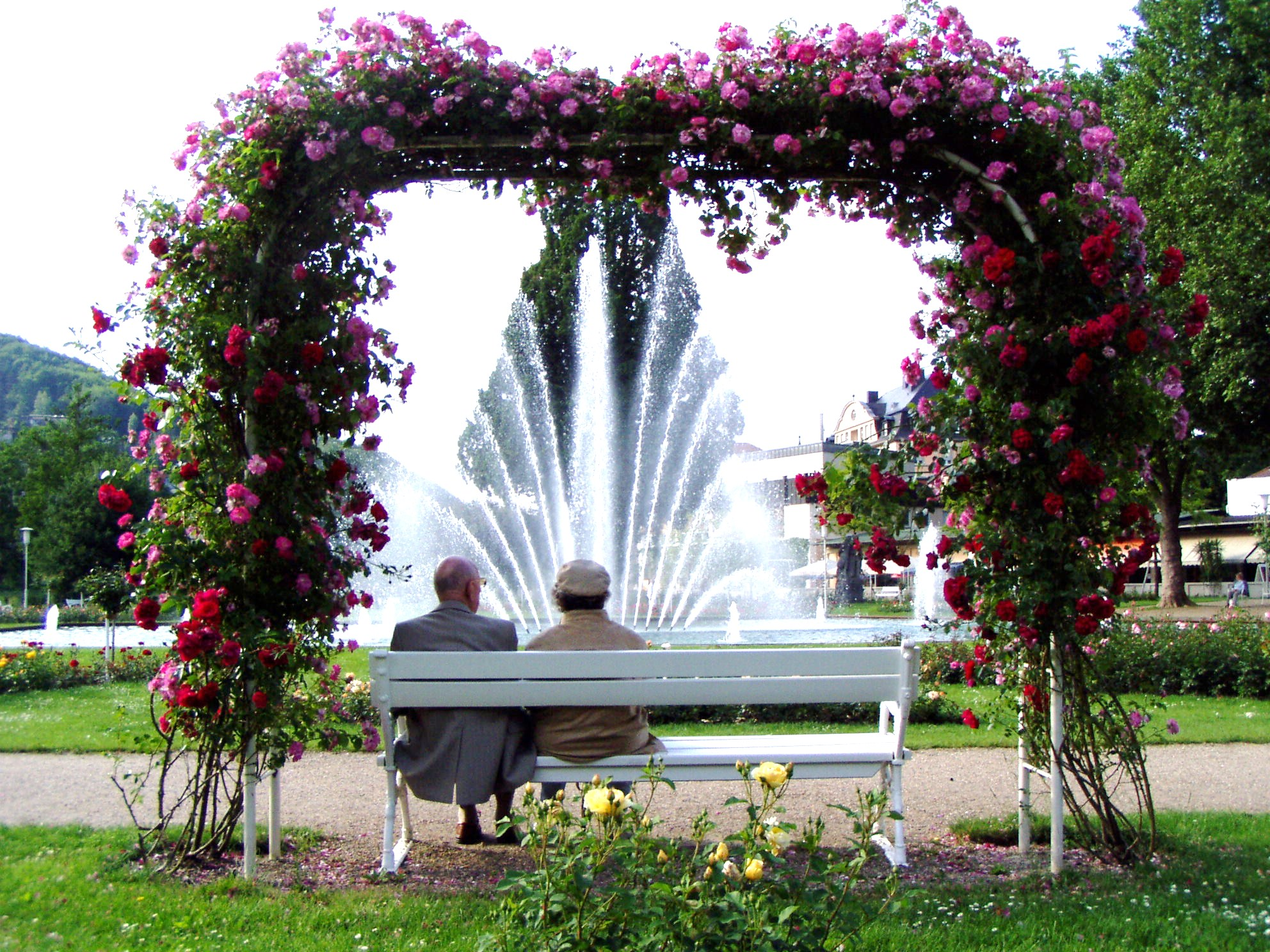
Rosengarten Rose Garden in Bad Kissingen

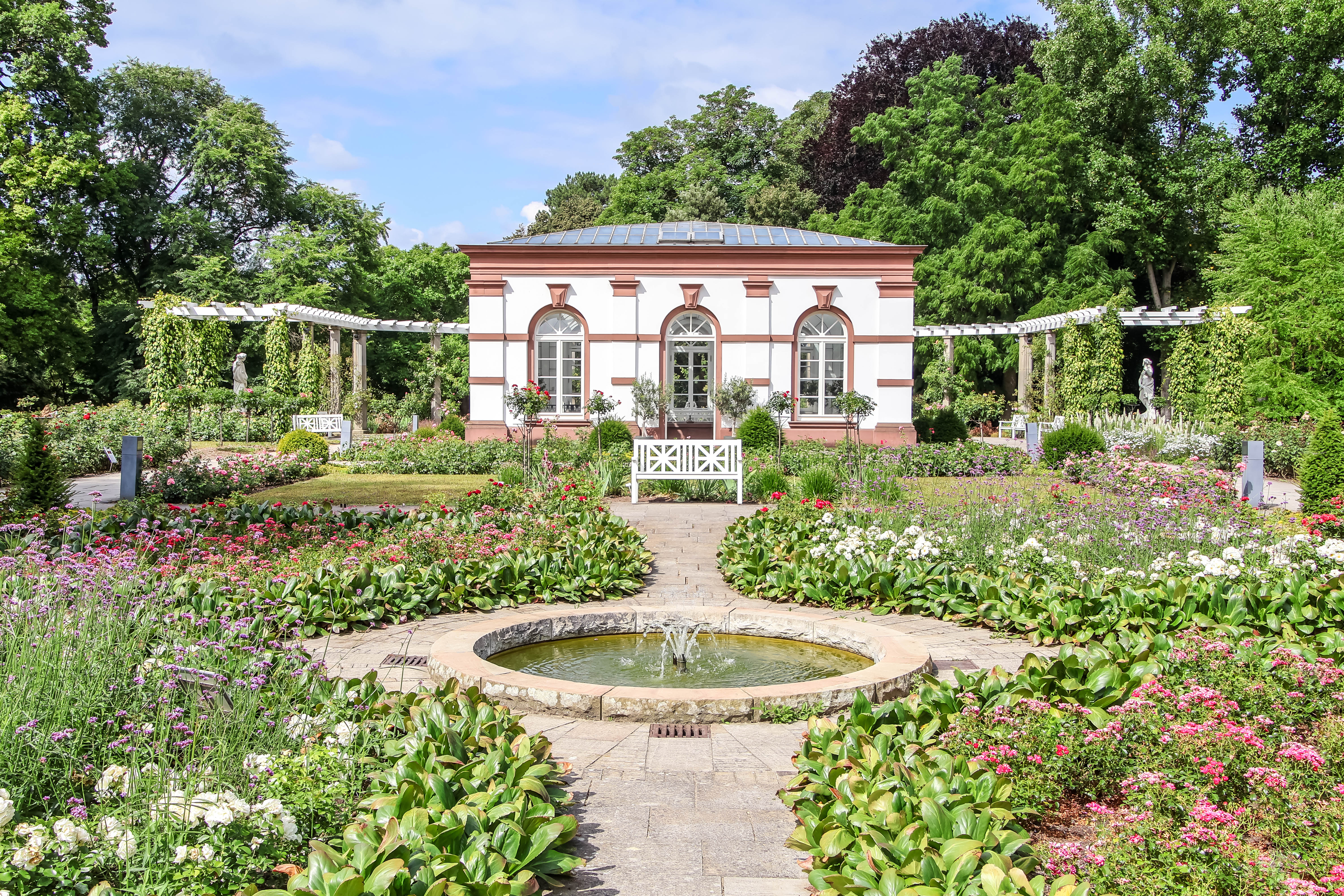
Rose garden in Palmengarten Frankfurt

- Europa-Rosarium in Sangerhausen, Germany was founded by the German Rose Society in 1898, opening to the public five years later. The foundation of the huge rose collection was species roses collected by the amateur rosarian Albert Hoffmann. The gardens acquired few new varieties between 1950 and 1990, but its collection of earlier classes – Polyanthas, Hybrid Perpetuals, Noisette hybrids and ramblers – is encyclopaedic. Some 2,000 cultivars are said to be unique to the garden. It was granted the WFRS's Award of Garden Excellence in 2003.
- Rosarium Uetersen in Uetersen, Germany was established in 1929 with assistance from Mathias Tantau and Wilhelm Kordes. It contains over 1,000 rose varieties.
- Rosenneuheitengarten Beutig in Baden-Baden was created between 1979 and 1981 and is the venue of the Baden-Baden Rose Trials. It contains about 5000 plants in a demonstration garden and a trial garden where more than 400 roses are tested for four years. It was granted the WFRS's Award of Garden Excellence in 2003.
- Westfalenpark in Dortmund was developed in 1969 as the West German National Rosarium and contains around 50,000 roses within a contemporary design. It has themed rose gardens, including a romantic and a medieval garden, and glasshouses containing tender roses.

=== India ===
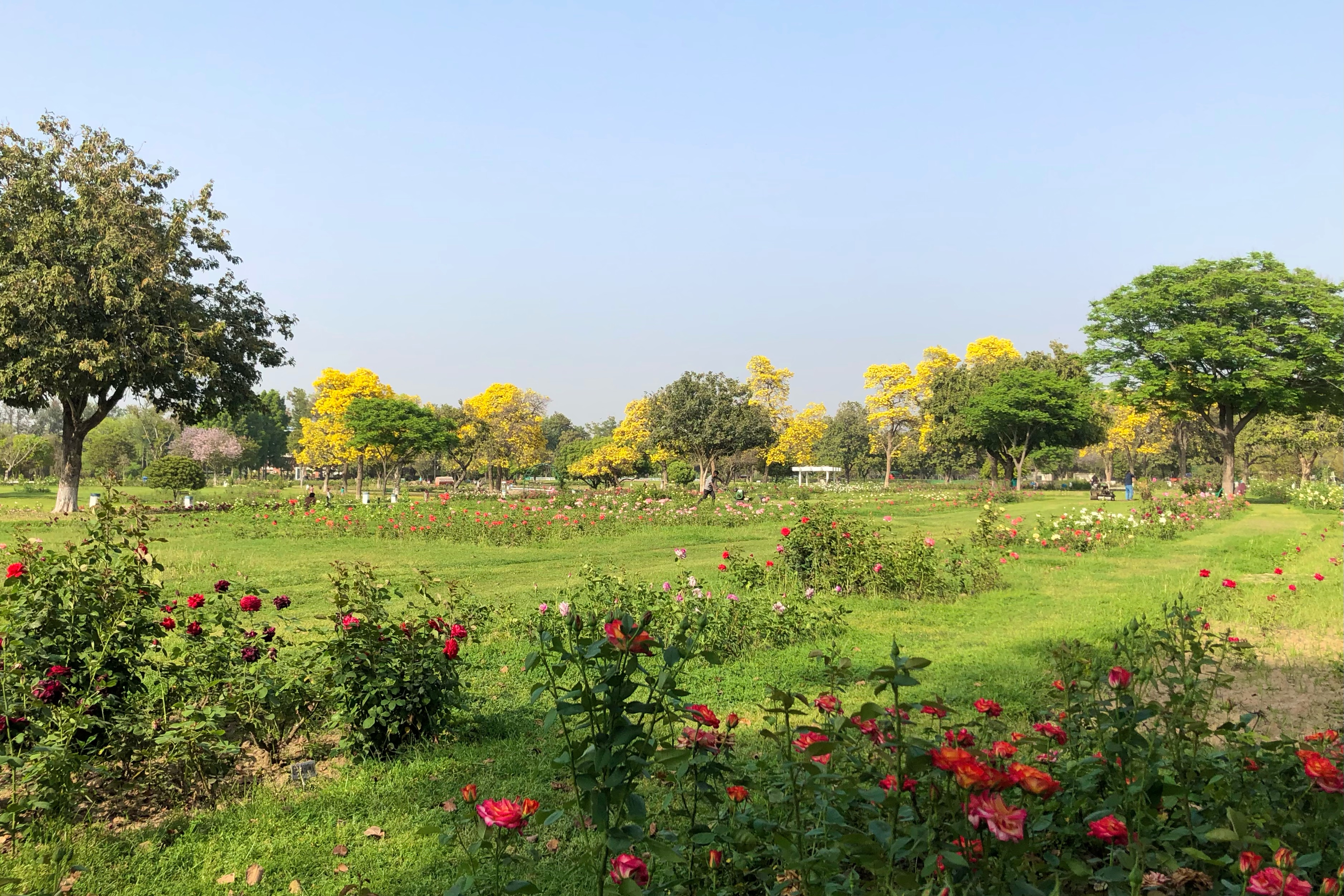
Zakir Hussain Rose Garden in Chandigarh, India

There are various rose gardens in India. These gardens have thousands of varieties & sub-varieties of roses and are open to the public.

- Government Rose Garden (formerly Centenary Rose Garden) in Udugamandalam (Ooty) in the state of Tamil Nadu has a collection of 2800 cultivars. It was granted the WFRS's Award of Garden Excellence in 2006.
- Zakir Hussain Rose Garden of Chandigarh (combined capital of Punjab & Haryana states).
- National Rose Garden, Chanakyapuri, Delhi.

=== Israel ===
- The Wohl Rose Park in Jerusalem. Over 400 varieties of roses are grown there, many of them gifts from countries around the world. The Wohl Rose Park covers 19 acres (77,000 m2).

=== Italy ===
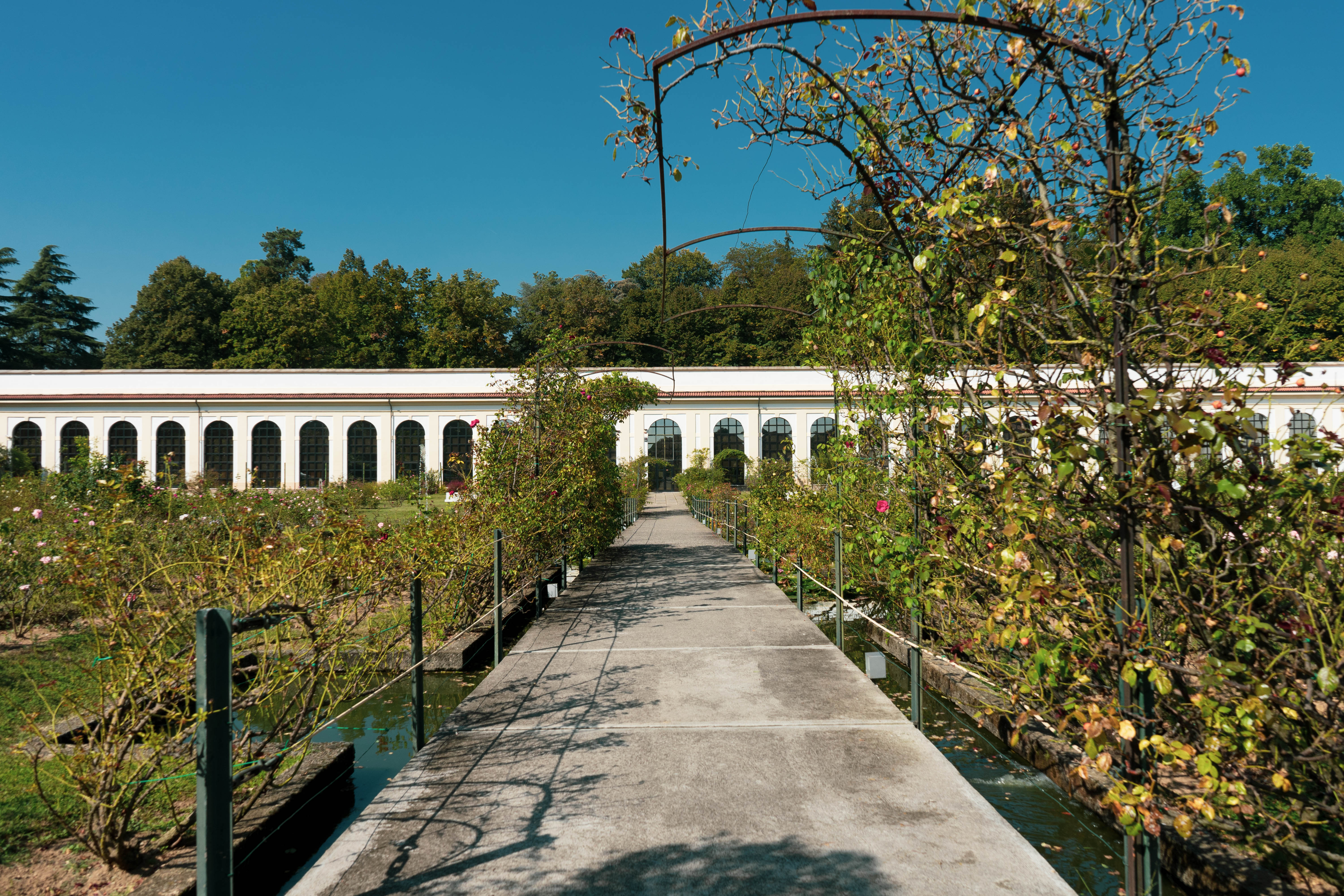
Niso Fumagalli Rose Garden in Monza, Italy

- Niso Fumagalli Rose Garden, in Italian: Roseto Niso Fumagalli, is a public garden in Monza, Italy, located within the complex of the Palace of Monza, in front of the Orangerie. The garden was established in 1964. Over 4000 varieties of roses are grown there, many of them gifts from countries around the world. On 21 May 2004, on the occasion of the 40th edition of the International Competitions for New Roses in Monza, the Monza Rose Garden was awarded by the then Vice President for Europe of the World Federation of Rose Societies, Maurice Jay, of the highly coveted "Award of Garden Excellence". The rose garden is open free of charge in conjunction with the exhibitions that are organized at the Orangerie of the Royal Villa of Monza.
- Rome Rose Garden, also known as Il Roseto, is a public garden in Rome, Italy, located opposite the Circus Maximus on the Aventine Hill. The park was established in 1931. Over 1100 varieties of roses are grown there, many of them gifts from countries around the world. The Rome Rose Garden covers 10,000 m square and each section has rose varieties characteristic of, or grown in, the respective variety. The park also has an experimental section where new varieties of roses are tested for their suitability for public and private gardens in Italy.
- Fineschi Garden, in the Cavriglia municipality of Tuscany was created by a rose-loving surgeon over a 40-year period and now extends over more than eight acres. It has sections devoted to different varieties, including Gallica and Hybrid Perpetual roses and also to the work of different breeders. These include important collections from less well-known rose growing nations, such as Argentina, Poland and Portugal. The garden is open for a limited period during the summer.

=== Lithuania ===
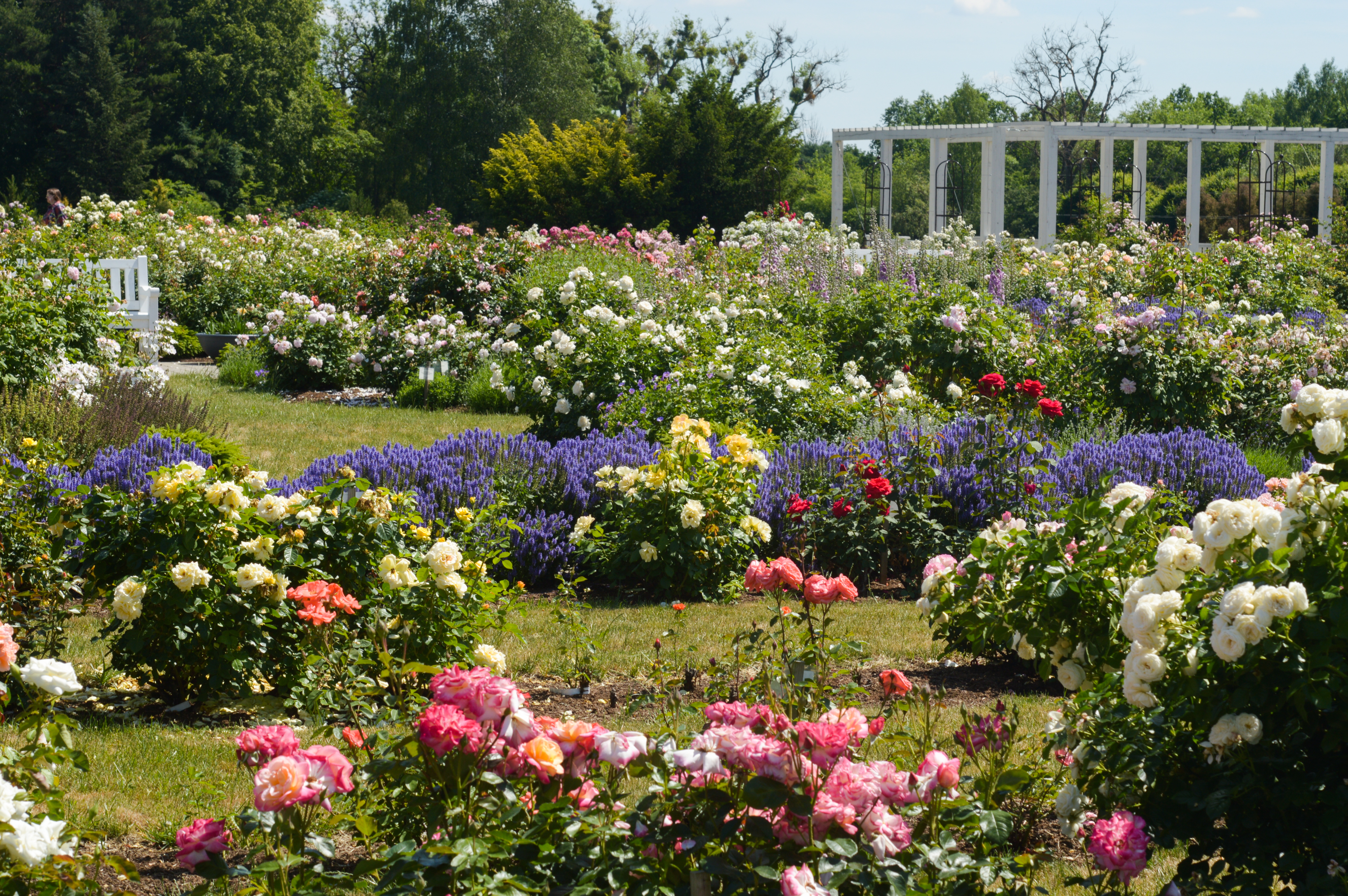
Rose garden at Vytautas Magnus University Botanical Garden in Kaunas, Lithuania

- Vytautas Magnus University Botanical Garden in Kaunas has the largest rose garden in Lithuania. It contains over 1,500 rose varieties.

=== Netherlands ===
- Westbroekpark is a public park in The Hague, and the large rose garden and trial grounds for testing new varieties was created in 1961. More than 20,000 rose plants are set out in large beds and the focus is on new varieties.
- Rosarium Oudwijk (Wilhelminapark) is a public park in Utrecht, and the large rose garden was created in 1913.

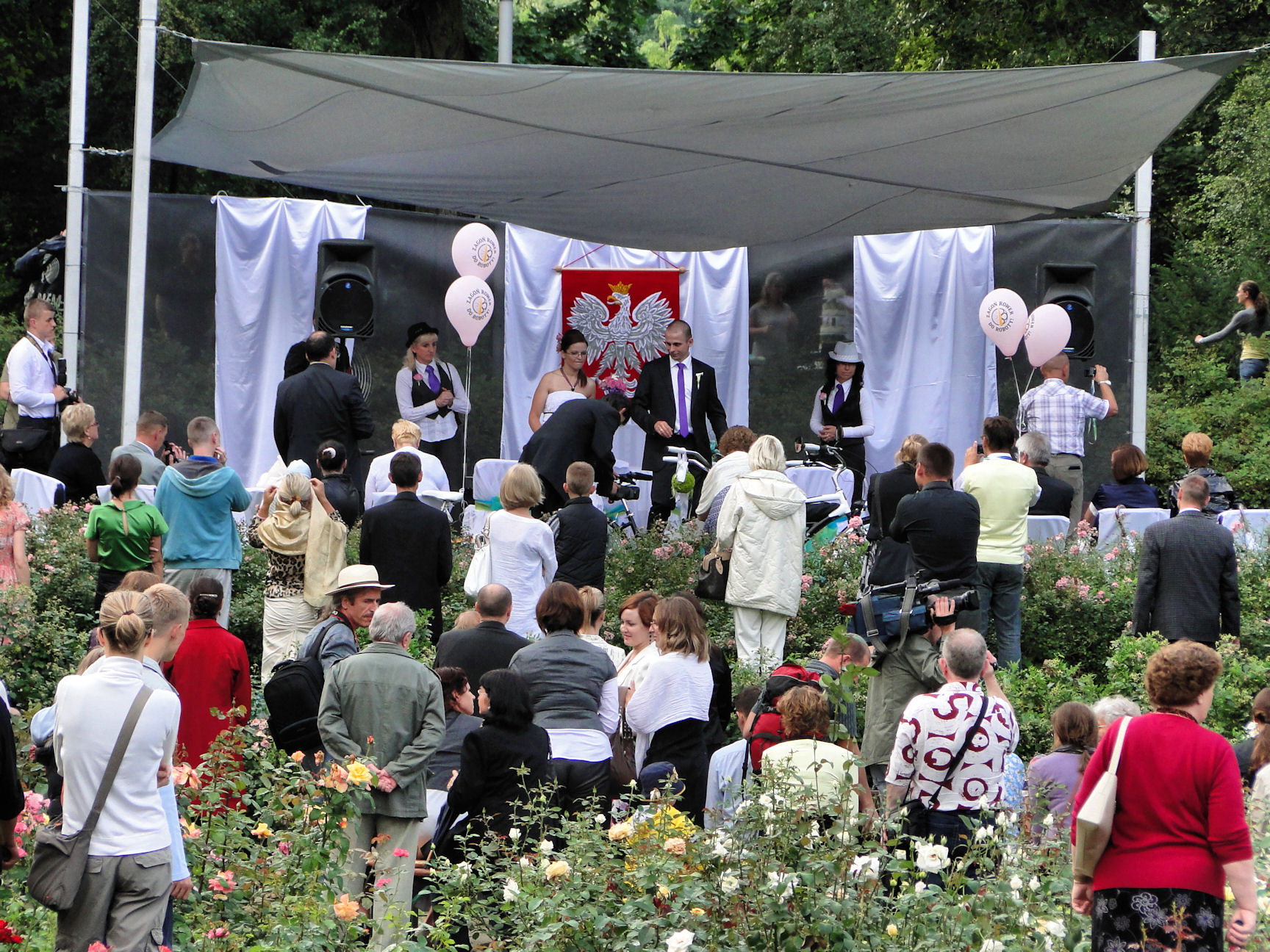
Wedding in Różanka Rose Garden in Szczecin, Poland

=== Poland ===
- Różanka Rose Garden is a public park in Szczecin, Poland, established in 1928, now with nine thousand roses of 99 varieties planted on the area of two hectares. The park is situated in the central part of the city, near Jan Kasprowicz Park.

=== South Africa ===
- Durbanville Rose Garden is a rose garden in the town of Durbanville, South Africa. This is a 3.5-hectare (8.6-acre) garden with 500 rose varietals on 4500 bushes.

=== Spain ===
- La Rosaleda del Parque del Oeste in Parque del Oeste, Madrid. Dedicated rose garden ("rosaleda"), stablished 1956. It contains species from 18th century on. It hosts international contests regularly. Public free access.
- La Rosaleda del Retiro in Buen Retiro Park, Madrid. One of the park's attractions. Created by Chief Gardener Cecilio Rodriguez in the 1930s.

=== Switzerland ===
- Parc de la Grange in Geneva is a terraced formal setting where a huge variety of roses are combined with statuary, pools and fountains. During the summer months the garden is floodlit after dark to show off the roses. Originally created in the aftermath of World War II, the rose garden of the Parc de la Grange has expanded and was home to the prestigious Geneva International New Rose Competition. In late 2020, after severe soil depletion, the rose garden has closed and will be reconstructed to include more than 400 feet of roses of nearly 200 different varieties, to be managed only using organic products.

=== United Kingdom ===
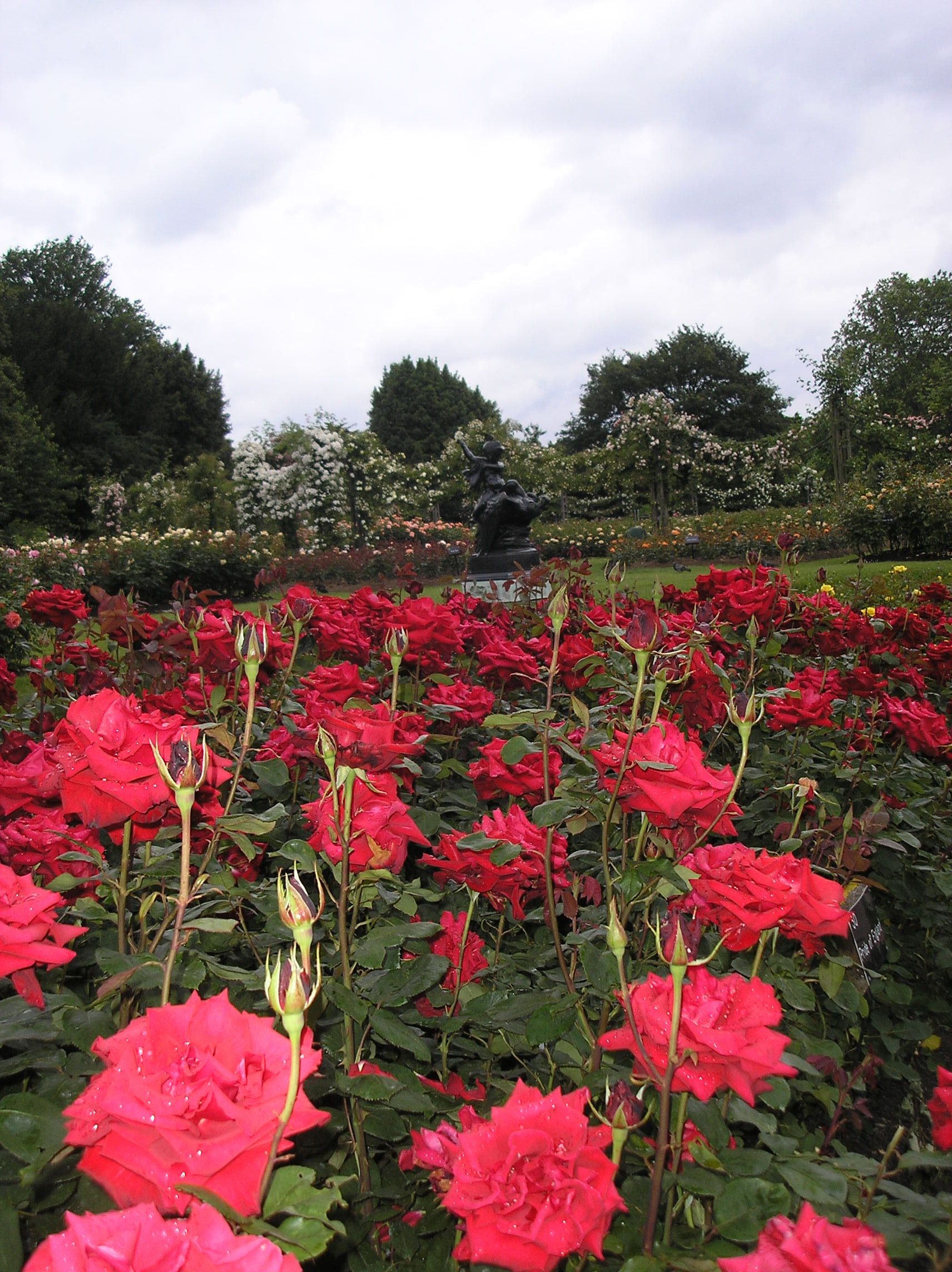
Queen Mary Gardens in Regent's Park, London

- Mottisfont Abbey in Hampshire is a 13th-century former priory on the banks of the River Test, now owned by the National Trust. The rose garden is a much later addition, having been created in 1972 by Graham Stuart Thomas, the British horticulturalist and rosarian. It houses a National Collection of historic shrub roses.
- Royal National Rose Society Gardens is the official garden of the Royal National Rose Society and is located at its headquarters near St Albans. Reopened in 2007, after a four-year closure and redesign, it contains more than 7,000 plants of 2,500 varieties. Features include a collection showing the history of the rose, roses with companion plantings and designs to provide inspiration for growing roses in small gardens.
- Queen Mary Gardens in Regent's Park, London is a circular rose garden surrounded by a ring of pillars where climbers and ramblers are displayed. It includes a mix of formal rose beds and more informal displays and some 40,000 roses are in bloom in the summer.

=== United States ===
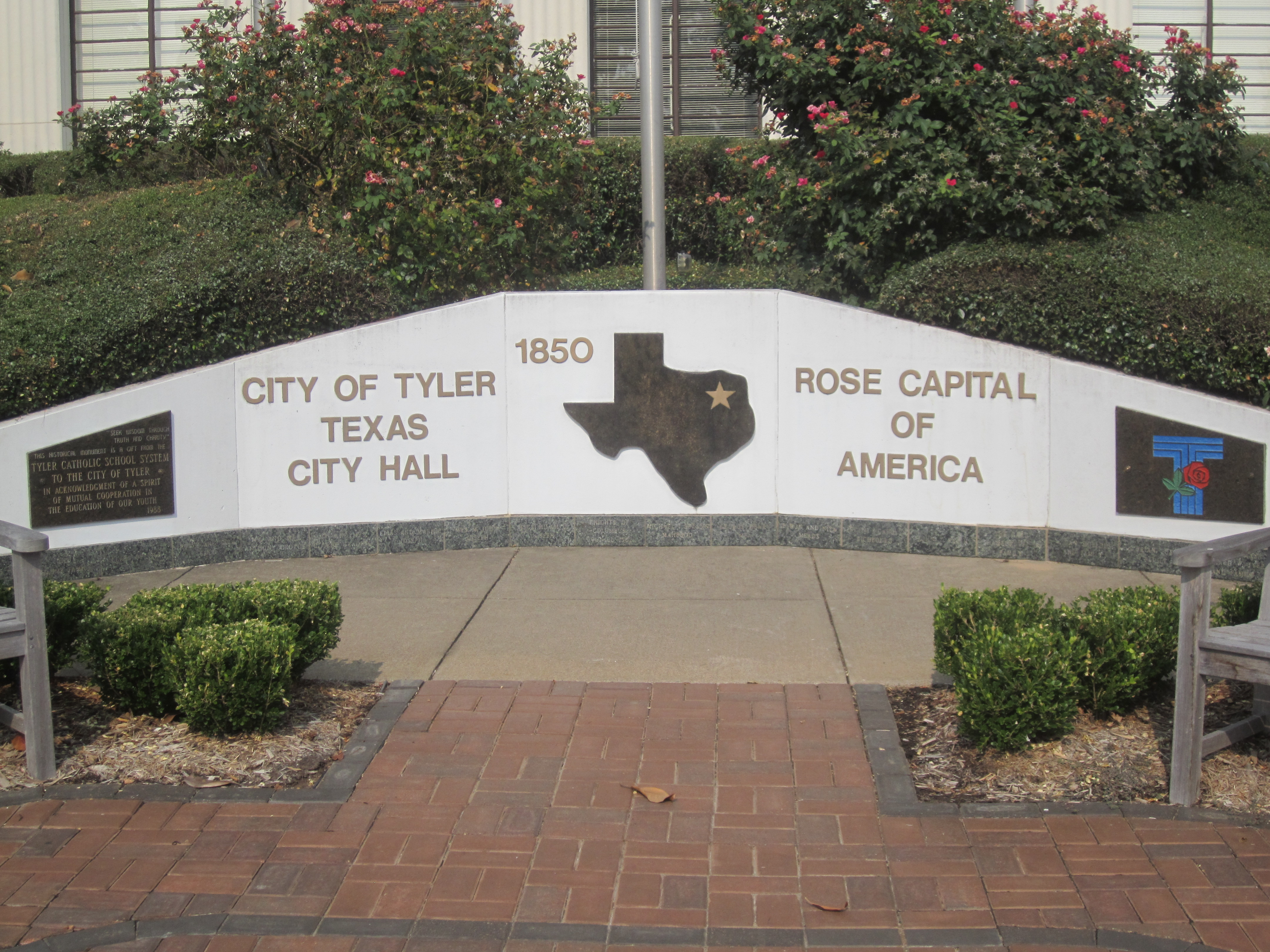
Tyler is called the "Rose Capital of America" for its rose-growing industry, large municipal rose garden and annual Texas Rose Festival

- The Gardens of the American Rose Center in Shreveport, Louisiana is headquarters of the American Rose Society and opened in 1974 (having relocated from Columbus, Ohio). It contains more than 65 individual rose gardens and 20,000 roses, shown with companion plants, sculptures and fountains.
- The Huntington Library in San Marino, California includes a vast botanical garden laid out in the early 20th century. The 1908 rose garden displays varieties of all types and shows its history and development as a garden plant. The complete garden has approximately 120 acres (49 ha) of specialized botanical landscaped gardens, including the "Japanese Garden", the "Desert Garden", and the "Chinese Garden", as well as camellia and cactus collections.
- The International Rose Test Garden in Portland, Oregon is a public garden used for testing and growing new varieties of rose, and helped establish Portland as a "City of Roses." Established in 1917, the Test Garden is the oldest official, continuously operating rose test garden in the United States, and possesses over 7000 plants of approximately 550 varieties. There are also a handful of themed gardens, such as the Miniature Rose Garden and Shakespeare Garden.
- Peggy Rockefeller Rose Garden in New York Botanical Garden, Bronx, New York displays over 4000 rose plants with over 600 varieties.
- The Rose Garden Center in Tyler, Texas was opened in 1952 and includes over 600 varieties of rose. It is also an All American Rose Selection (AARS) test garden. It hosts the Texas Rose Festival each October.
- Exposition Park Rose Garden in Los Angeles, California.
- The Elizabeth Park Conservancy Rose Garden in Hartford, Connecticut originally opened in June 1904. Today the rose garden covers 2.5 acres and has over 800 varieties and 15,000 rose bushes.
- The James P. Kelleher Rose Garden in Boston, Massachusetts is located within the Back Bay Fens, part of the city's Emerald Necklace parks. It is the location of the annual Mayor's Garden Party. It contains 200 varieties of roses and 1500 plants in total.
- The Roger Williams Park Victorian Rose Garden in Providence, Rhode Island. This garden was restored and is maintained with the assistance of the Rhode Island Rose Society. One of its notable features is the Brownell Rose Bed; the Brownells were famous Rhode Island rose hybridizers and many of their now hard-to-find varieties are preserved here.
- White House Rose Garden in Washington, D.C.
- Thomasville Rose Garden in Thomasville, Georgia. Once home to a world renowned test garden, the "City of Roses" boasts the second oldest Rose Show in the United States every year. The show takes place on the weekends of the fourth Friday in April and has been put on every year since 1921. The rose Garden is home to hundreds of varieties of roses.
- San Jose Municipal Rose Garden in San Jose, California.

=== Uruguay ===
- Rosaleda Juana de Ibarbourou in the Parque del Prado in Montevideo was created in 1912 by the French landscape architect Charles Racine with more than 10.000 roses imported from France in 1910. Its name pays tribute to the Uruguayan writer and poet Juana de Ibarbourou

== Well-being ==
Rose gardens are full of vibrant, fresh, and stimulating sights and scents. These beautiful gardens are pleasing not only to the eyes but to the mind and soul as well. Many research studies have found that being in the presence of flowers immediately induces positive emotions while suppressing feelings of depression and anxiety. Every flower has the ability to evoke a certain emotion. Depending on the flower you are engaged with, you may experience feelings such as nurturing, romantic, sensuous, tranquil, or whimsical.

== Gallery ==
Different Rose Gardens around the world

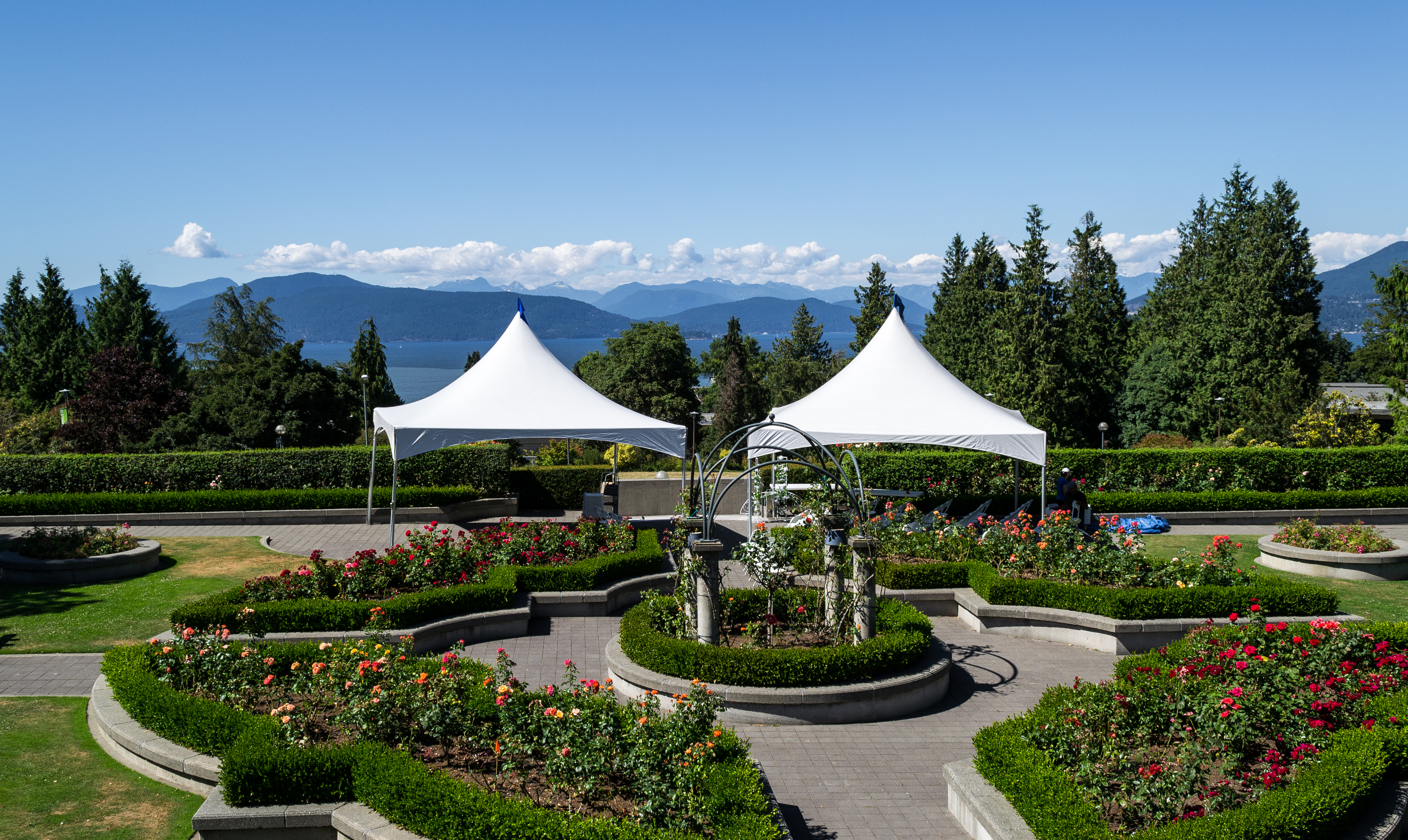
Rose Garden at the University of British Columbia in Vancouver, British Columbia, Canada

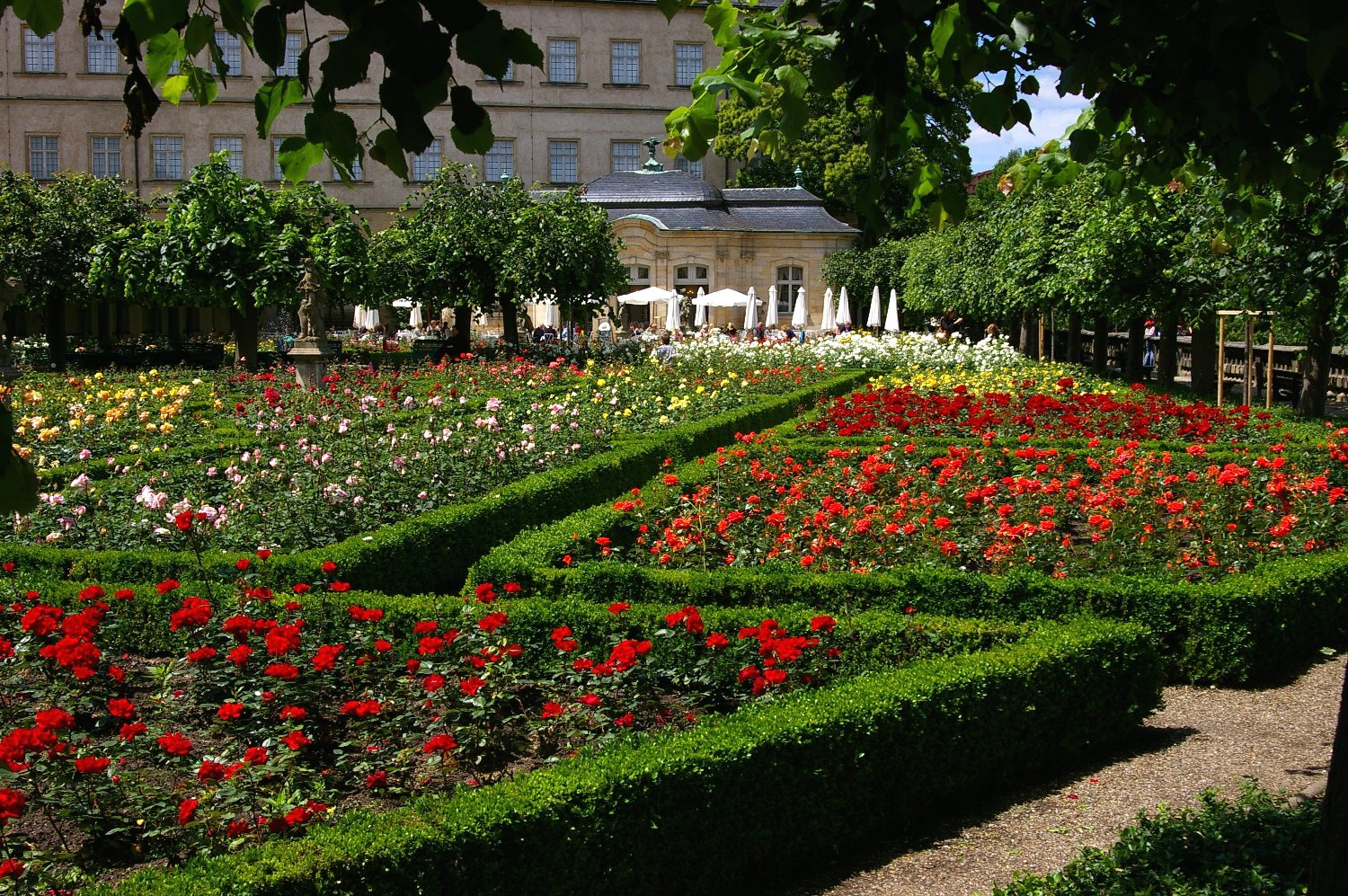
Bamberg Rose Garden, Germany

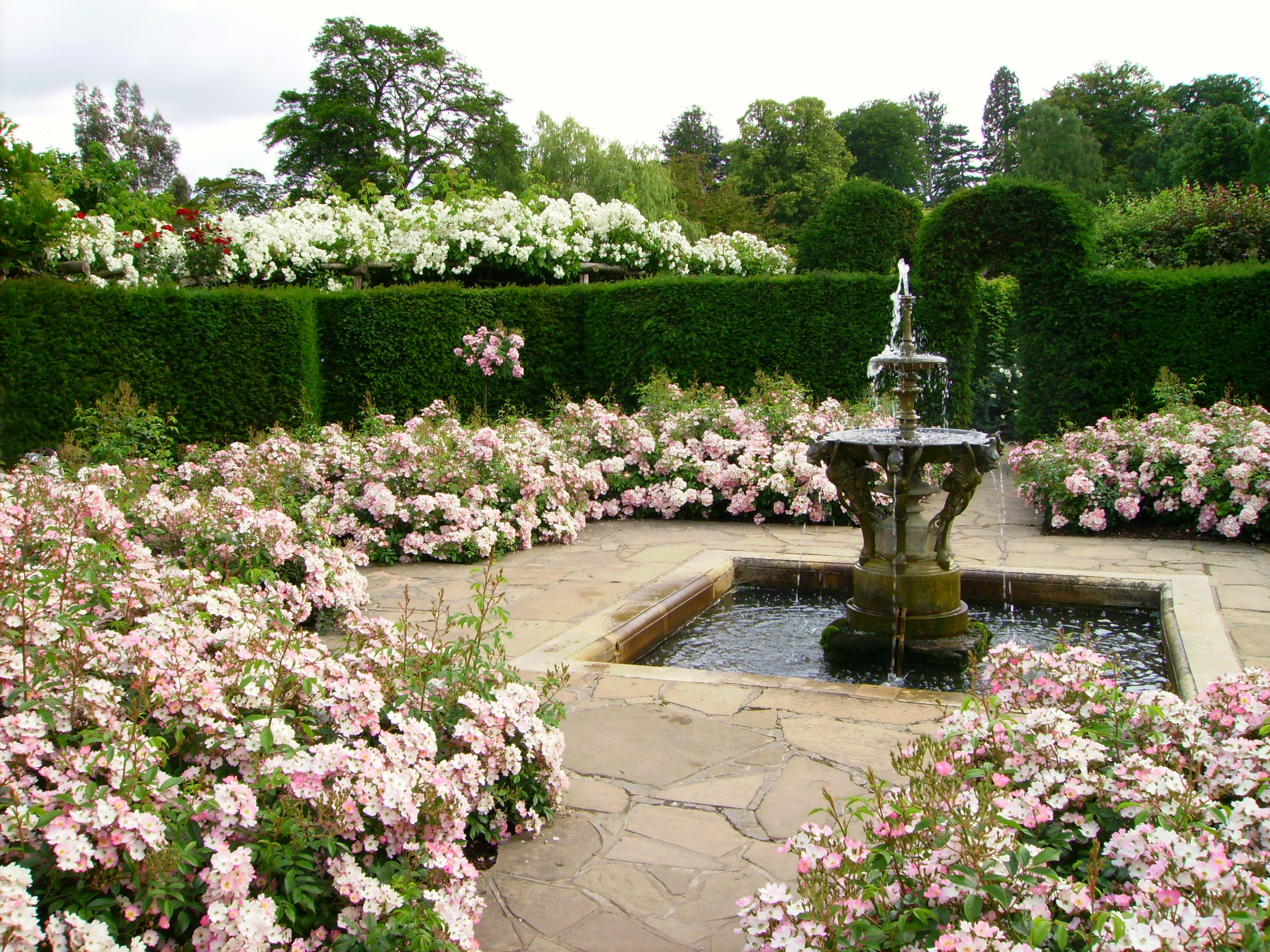
Rose garden at Hever Castle in Kent, United Kingdom

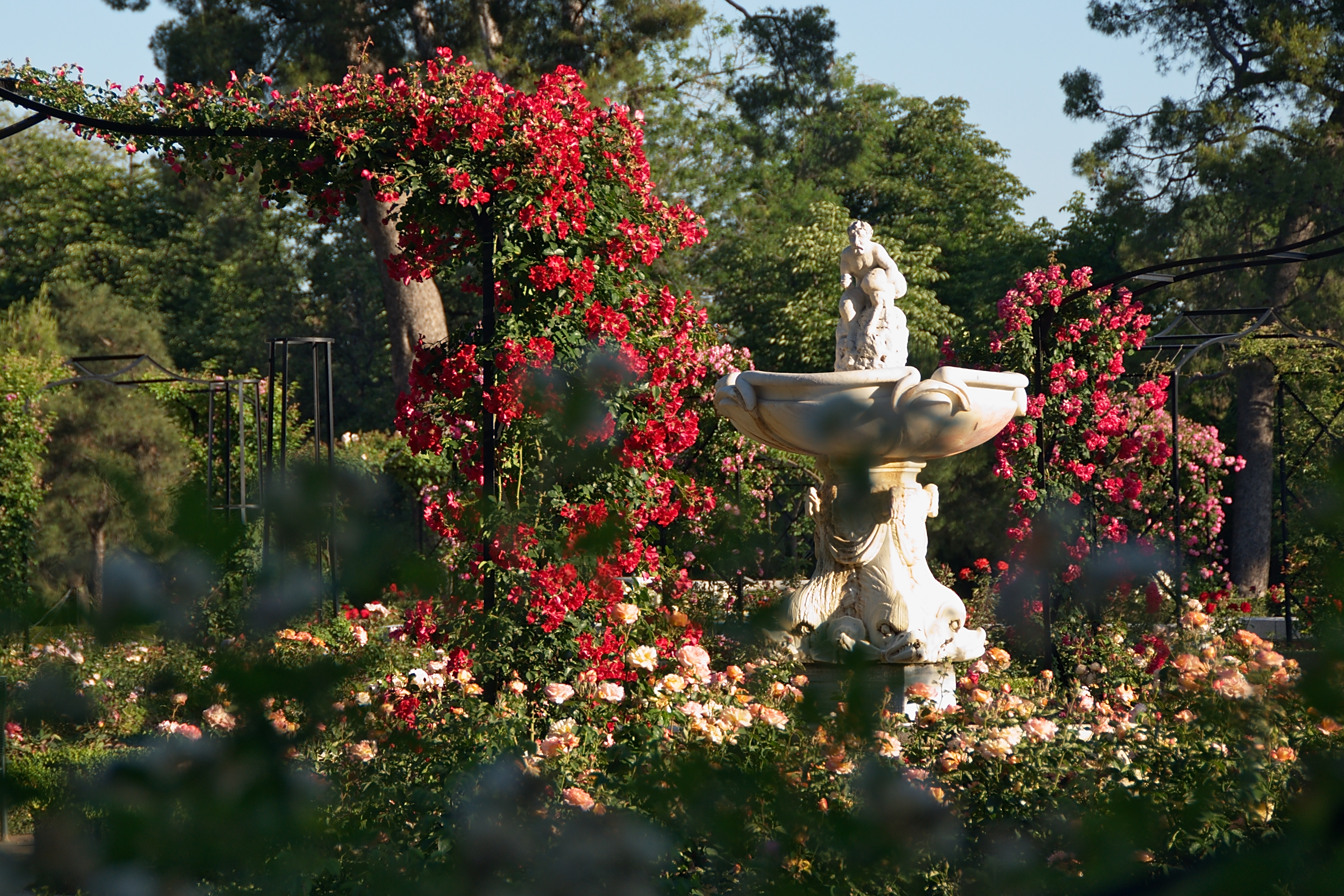
El Retiro rose garden in Madrid, Spain

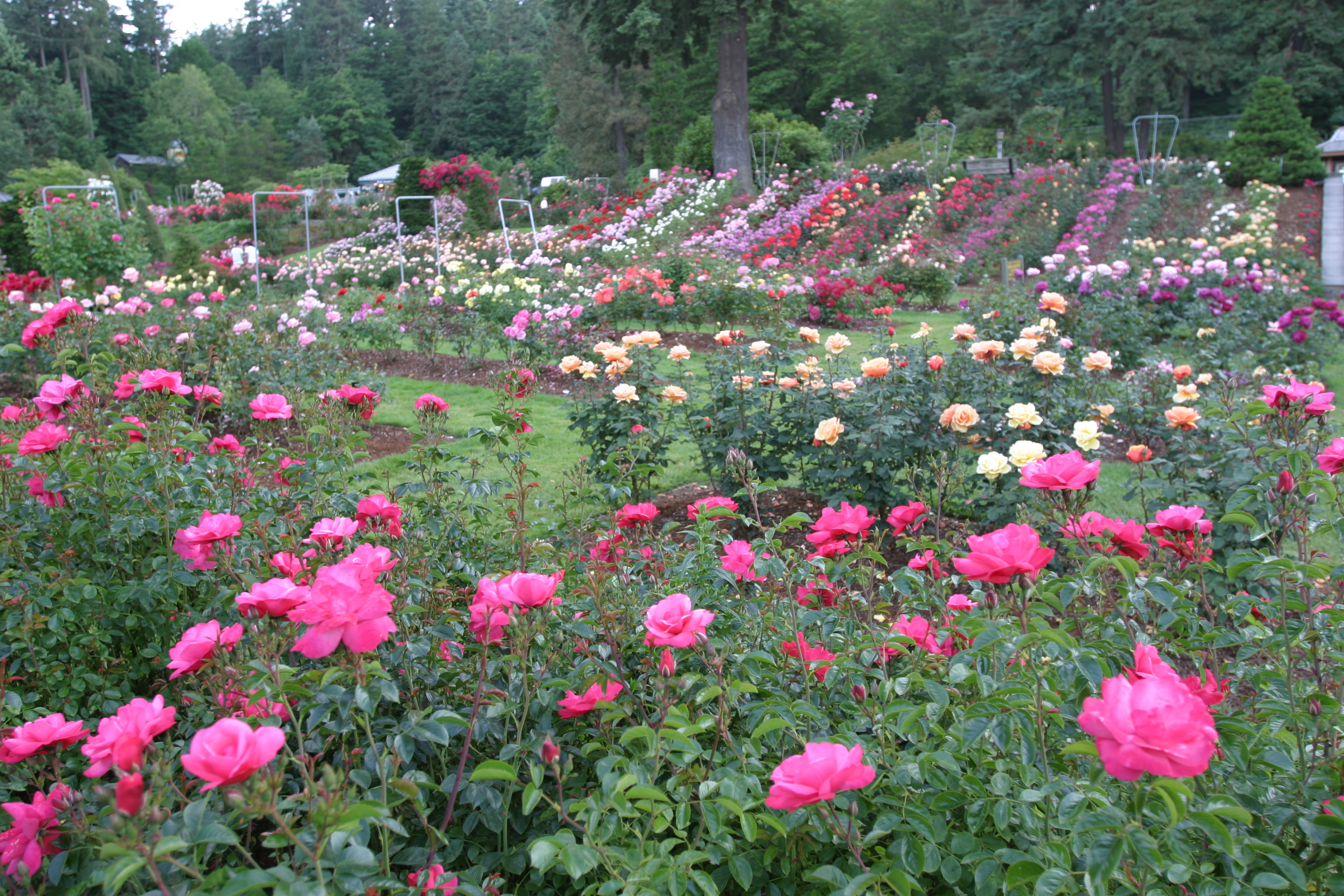
International Rose Test Garden in Portland, Oregon, United States

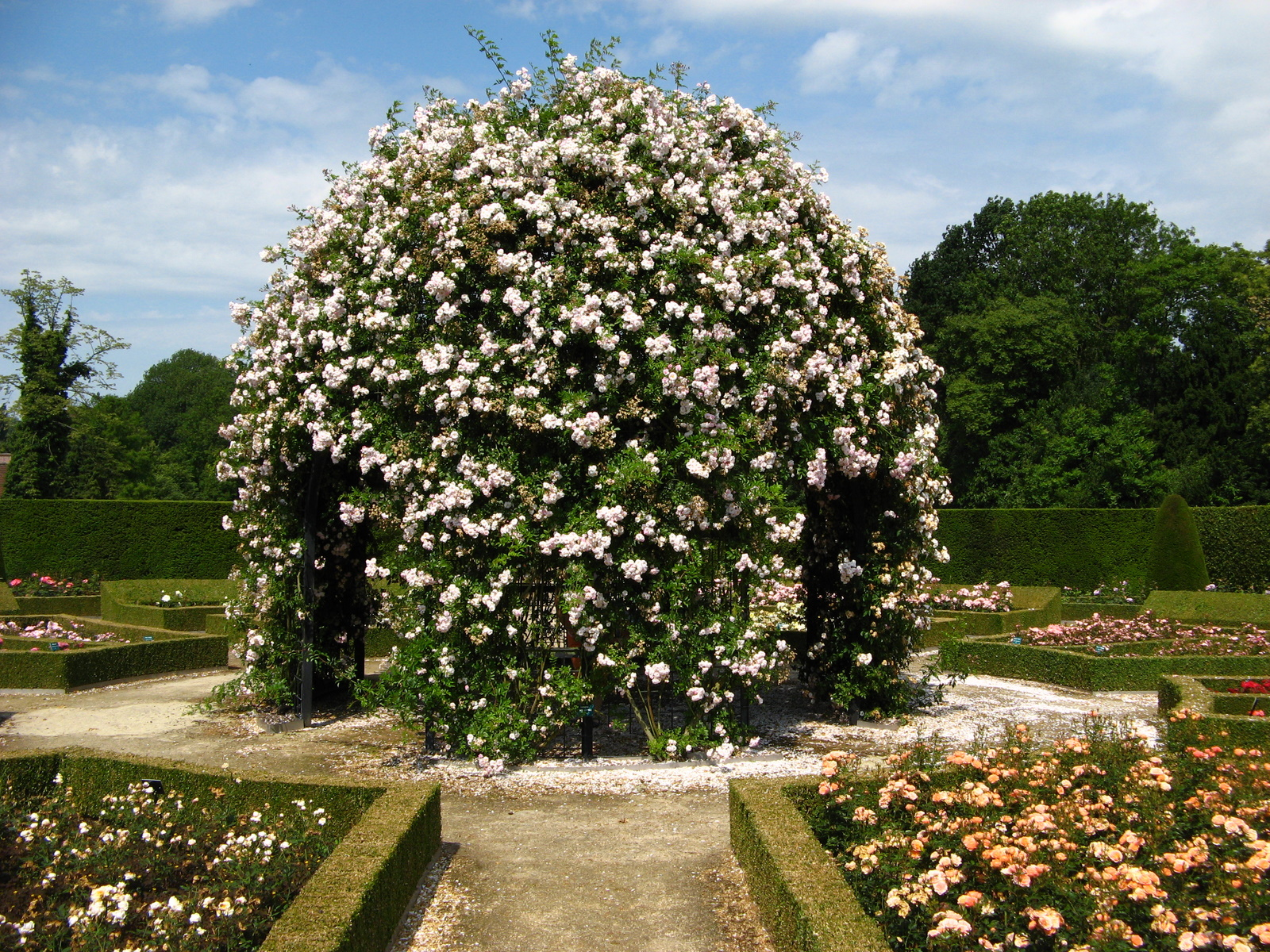
Coloma rose garden, Belgium

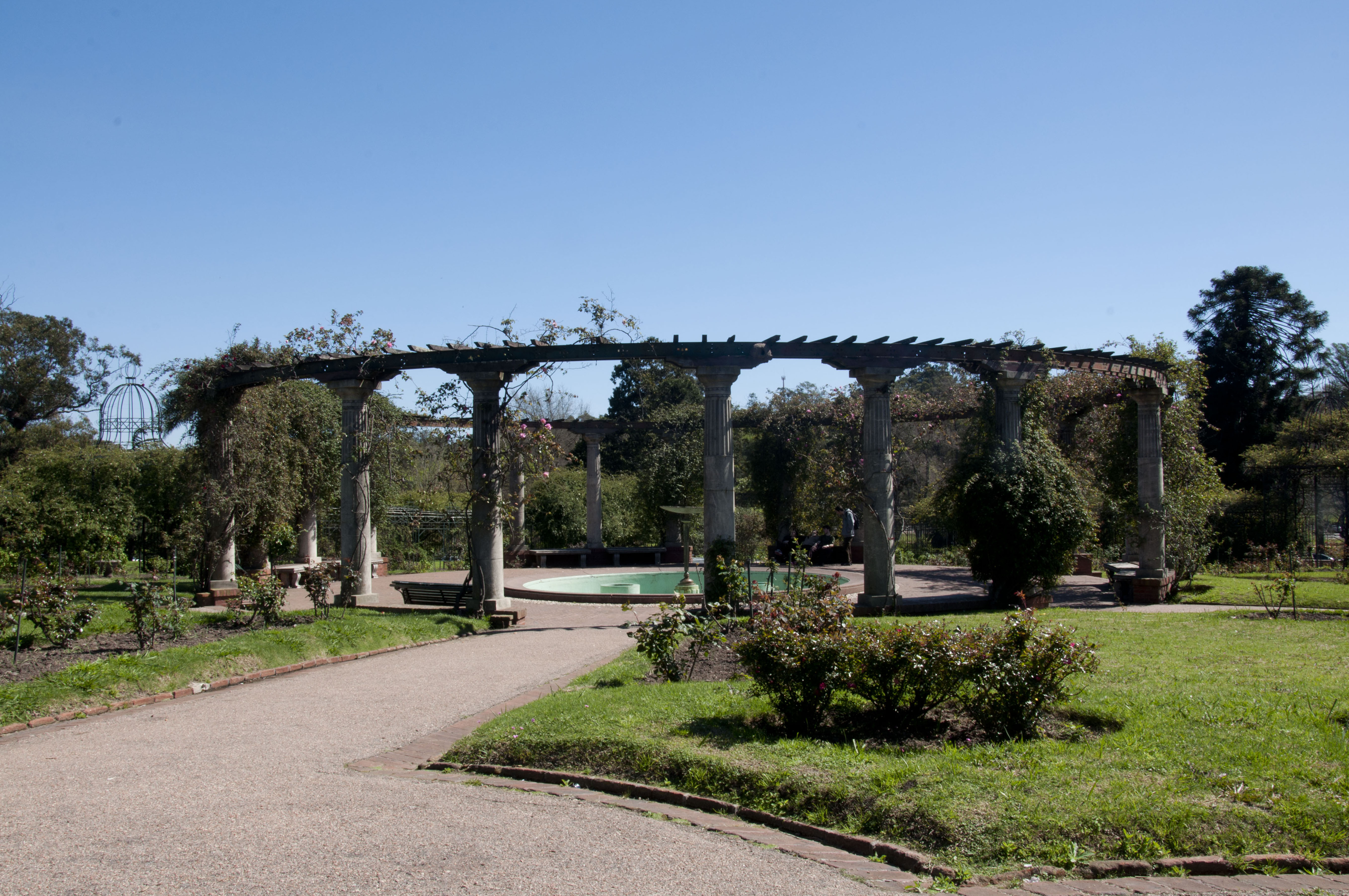
Rosedal del Prado, Montevideo, Uruguay

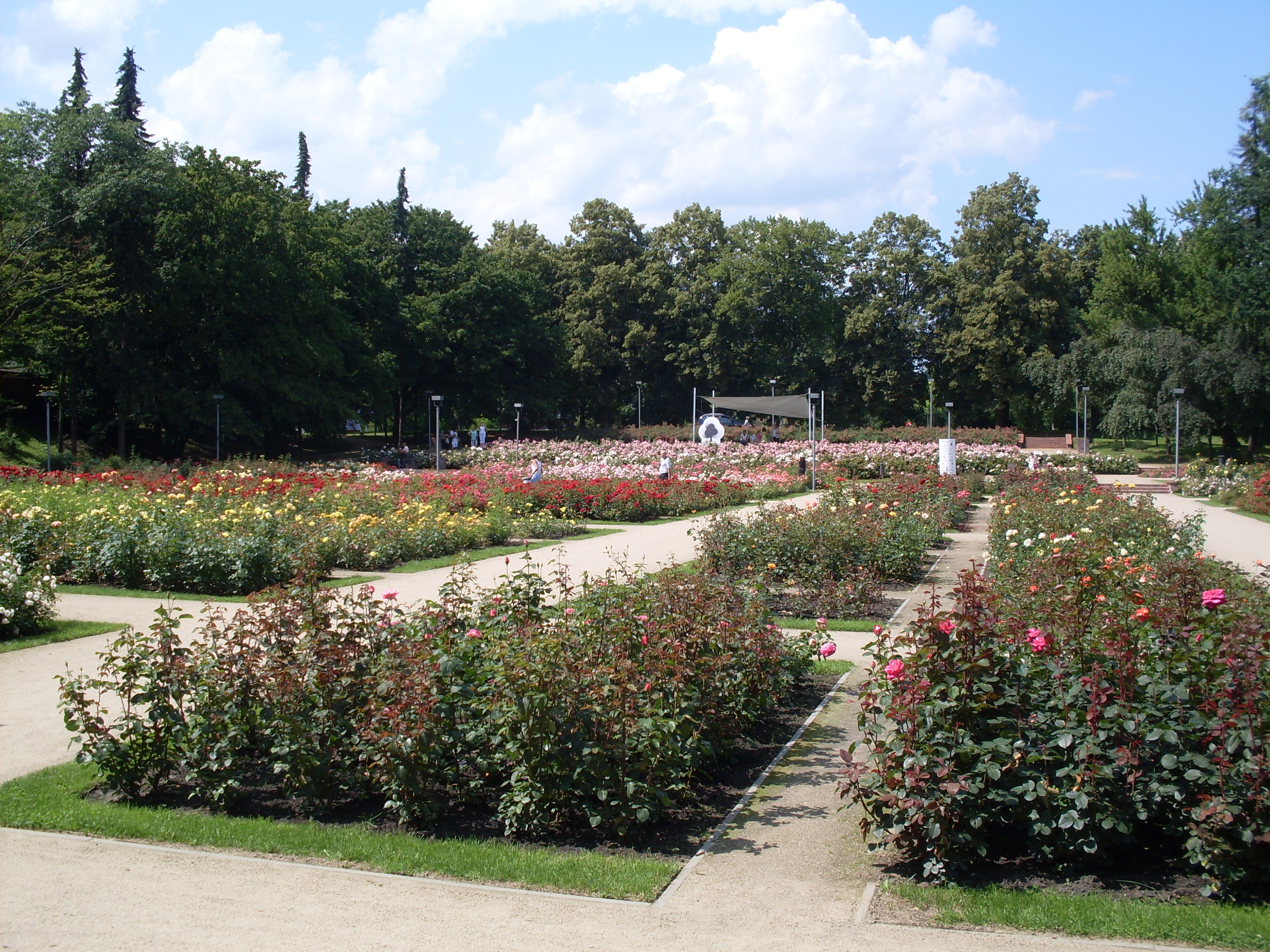
Różanka Rose Garden in Szczecin, Poland

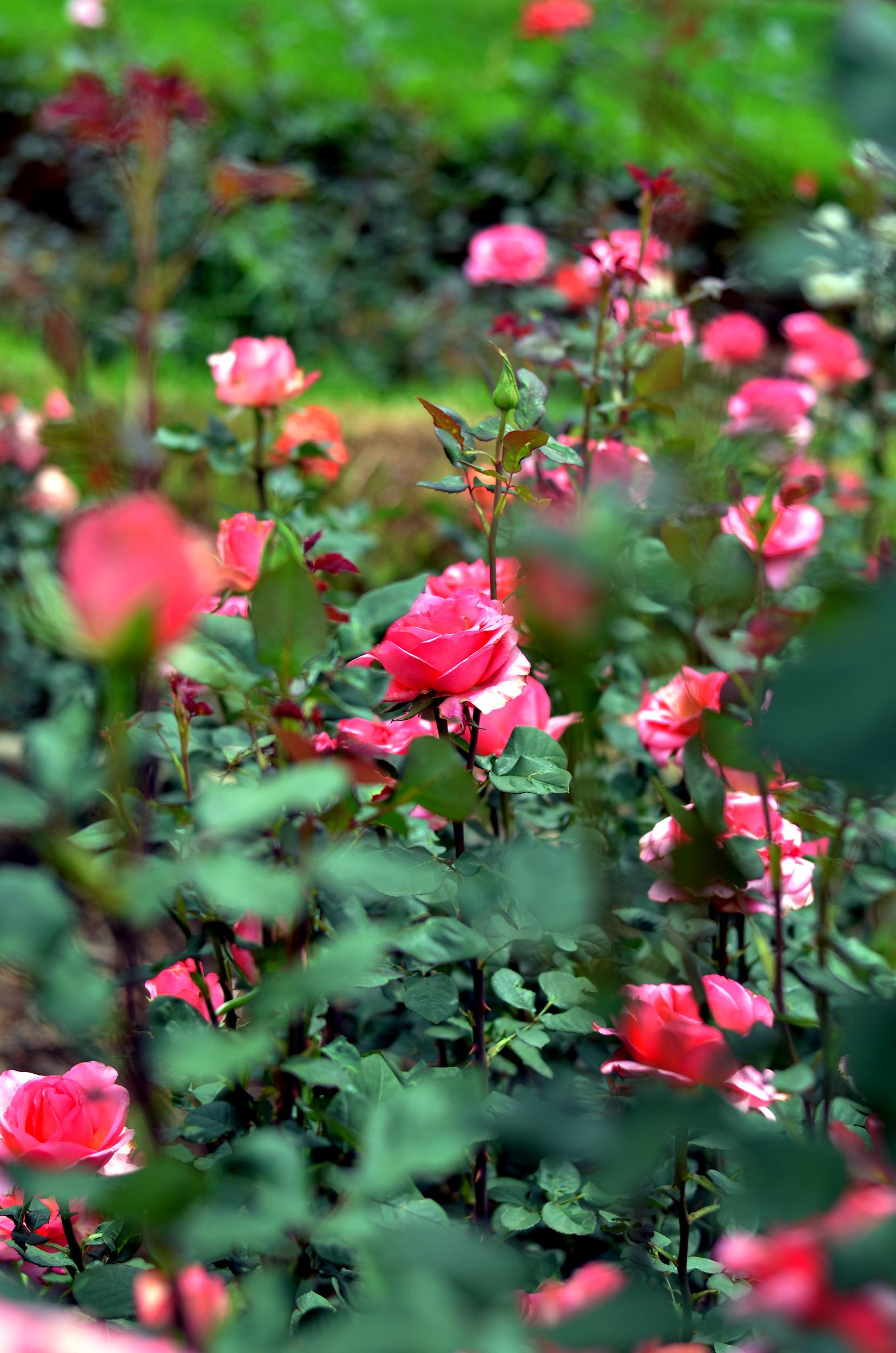
The Government Rose Garden in Ooty, India

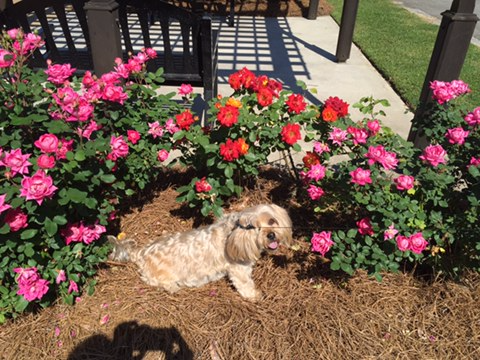
A dog enjoys the Thomasville Rose Garden

== See also ==
- Rose
- List of Rosa species
- List of rose cultivars named after people
- Rose trial grounds
- List of Award of Garden Merit roses
- ADR rose
- Rose show
- Rose cultivars

== Bibliography ==
- Jardins de roses, André Gayraud, éditions du Chêne, ISBN 2-84277-041-2
- Roseraies et jardins de roses, H. Fuchs in Le Bon jardinier, encyclopédie horticole, tome 1, La Maison rustique, Paris, 1964, ISBN 2-7066-0044-6.
