= Rome Rose Garden =

Rose garden in Rome, Italy

Coordinates: 41.8853°N 12.4834°E

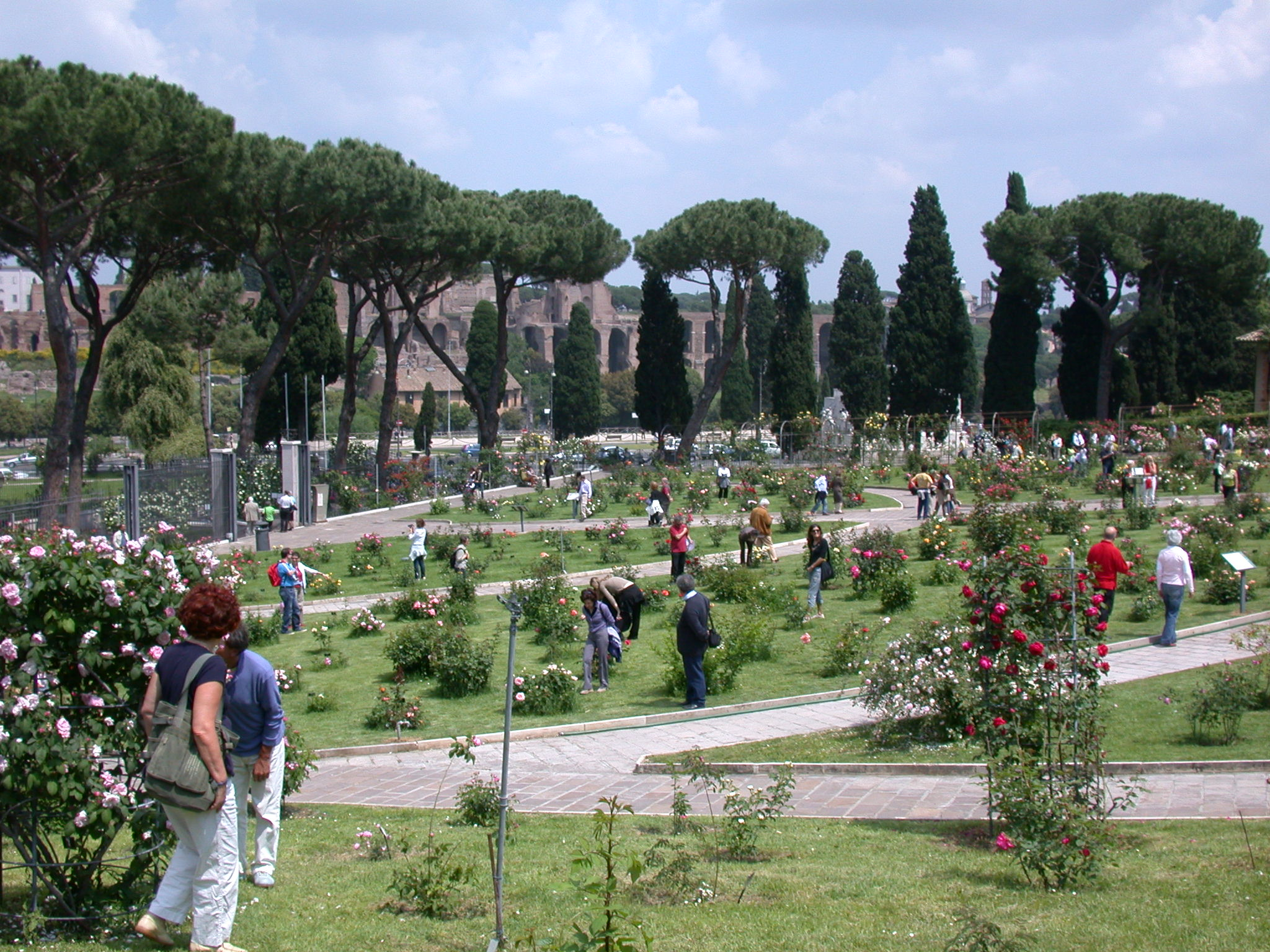
Rome Rose Garden

Rome Rose Garden, also known as Il Roseto, is a public garden in Rome, Italy, located opposite the Circus Maximus on the Aventine Hill. The park was established in 1931. Over 1100 varieties of roses are grown there, many of them gifts from countries around the world. The Rome Rose Garden covers 10,000 m square and each section has rose varieties characteristic of, or grown in, the respective variety. The park also has an experimental section where new varieties of roses are tested for their suitability for public and private gardens in Italy.

== History ==
In this site, near the Roman Ghetto, since 1645 until 1934 was in place the Jewish cemetery in Rome. Because of that, the site was named by the Roman people "Ortaccio degli ebrei" (English: garden of the Jews). In 1934 the Jewish community of Rome obtained as cemetery a section of the monumental cemetery of Campo Verano. To remember the past of the garden, the ensemble of its footpaths was designed as a reproduction of the Menorah. The original design for the park was drawn up in 1931 by countess Mary Gayley Senni, with 300 roses.

== Planting goals ==
When selecting the rose varieties, one of the goals was to show different groups of roses, the products of early breeding of roses and modern roses such as Hybrid roses, miniature roses, rose shrubs, and modern climbers. Another goal was to demonstrate various garden possibilities: Blossoming swathes of colour, roses climbing up pergolas and pillars, "sculpted" rose shrubs, rambling roses, standards roses, roses with decorative fruit, hedges made up of rose bushes, and more.

== See also ==
- Rose garden
