= Garden Society of Gothenburg =

Park and garden in Gothenburg, Sweden

Coordinates: 57°42′18″N 11°58′30″E

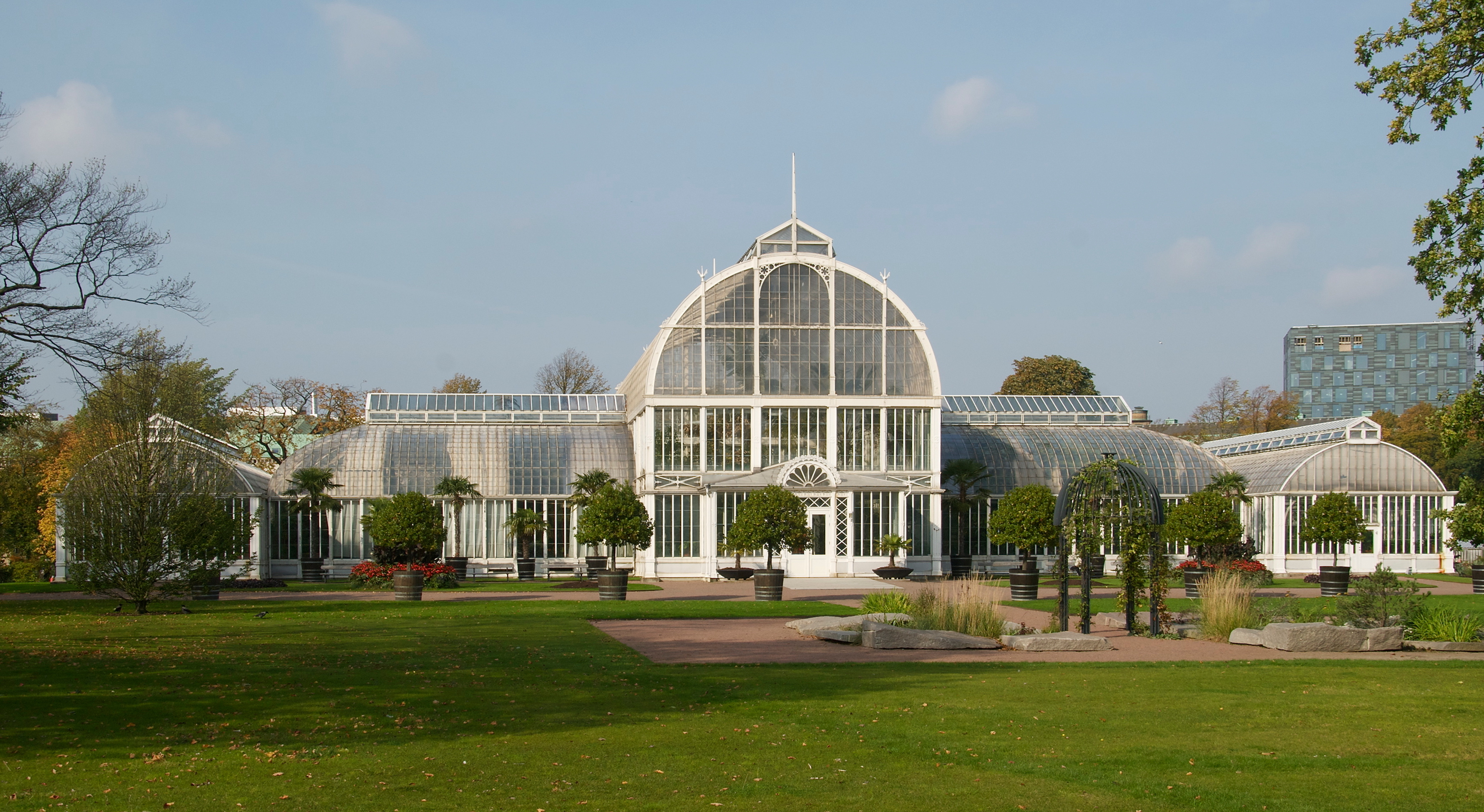
The palm greenhouse in Trädgårdsföreningen

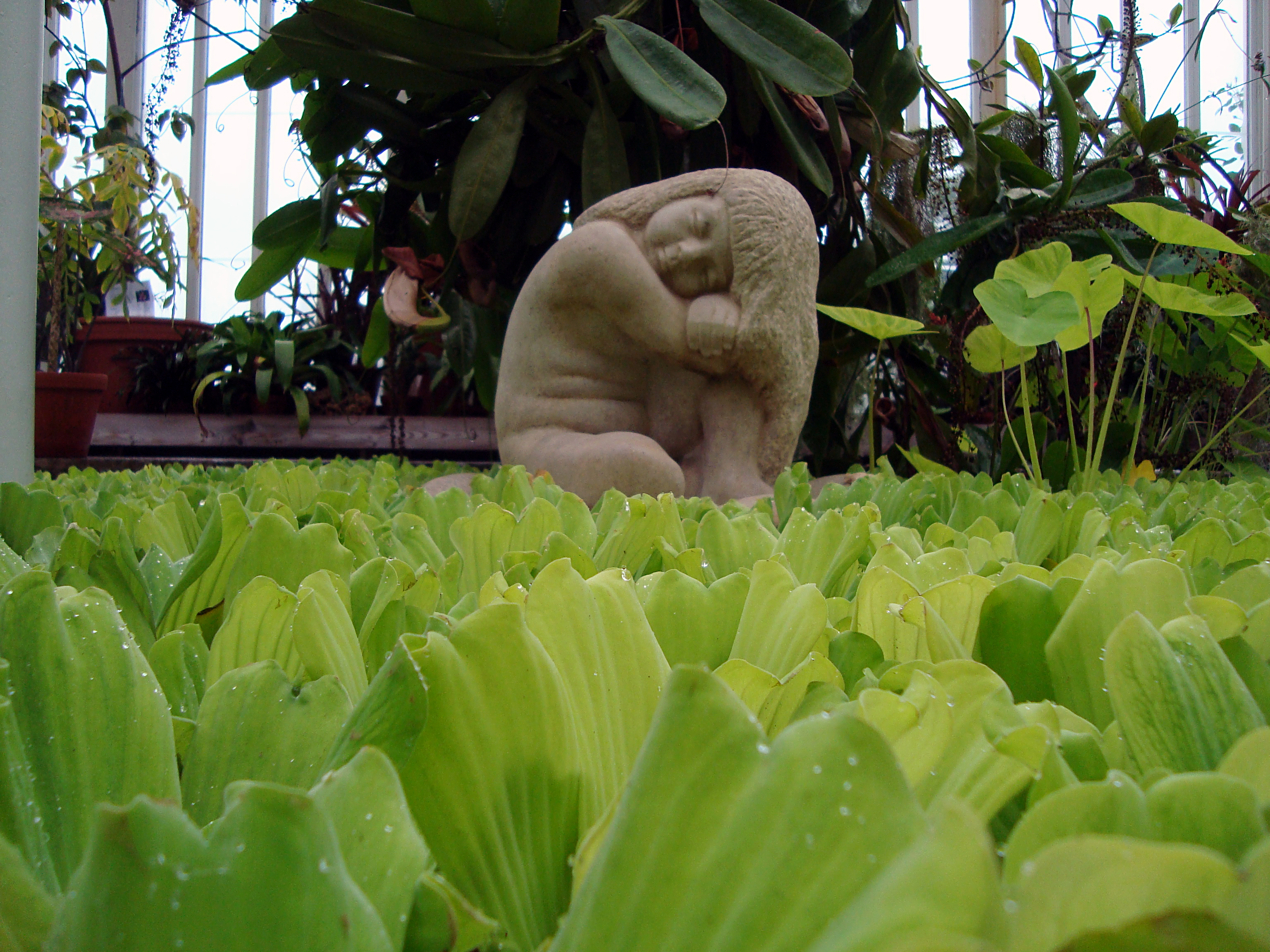
Sculpture in the palm house.

The Garden Society of Gothenburg (Swedish: Trädgårdsföreningen) is a park and horticultural garden in central Gothenburg, Sweden. It is located next to Kungsportsavenyen and the Gamla Ullevi stadium.

The park was founded in 1842 by King Carl XIV Johan, on initiative of the amateur botanist Henric Elof von Normann.

In the park there is an acclaimed rose garden with some 4,000 roses of 1,900 species. The rose garden has been awarded stars in the Michelin Green Guide. There is also a 19th-century palm house, greenhouses, sculptures, a restaurant and cafés.

It is one of the best preserved 19th century parks in Sweden.
