= Kungsparken, Gothenburg =

Park in Gothenburg, Sweden

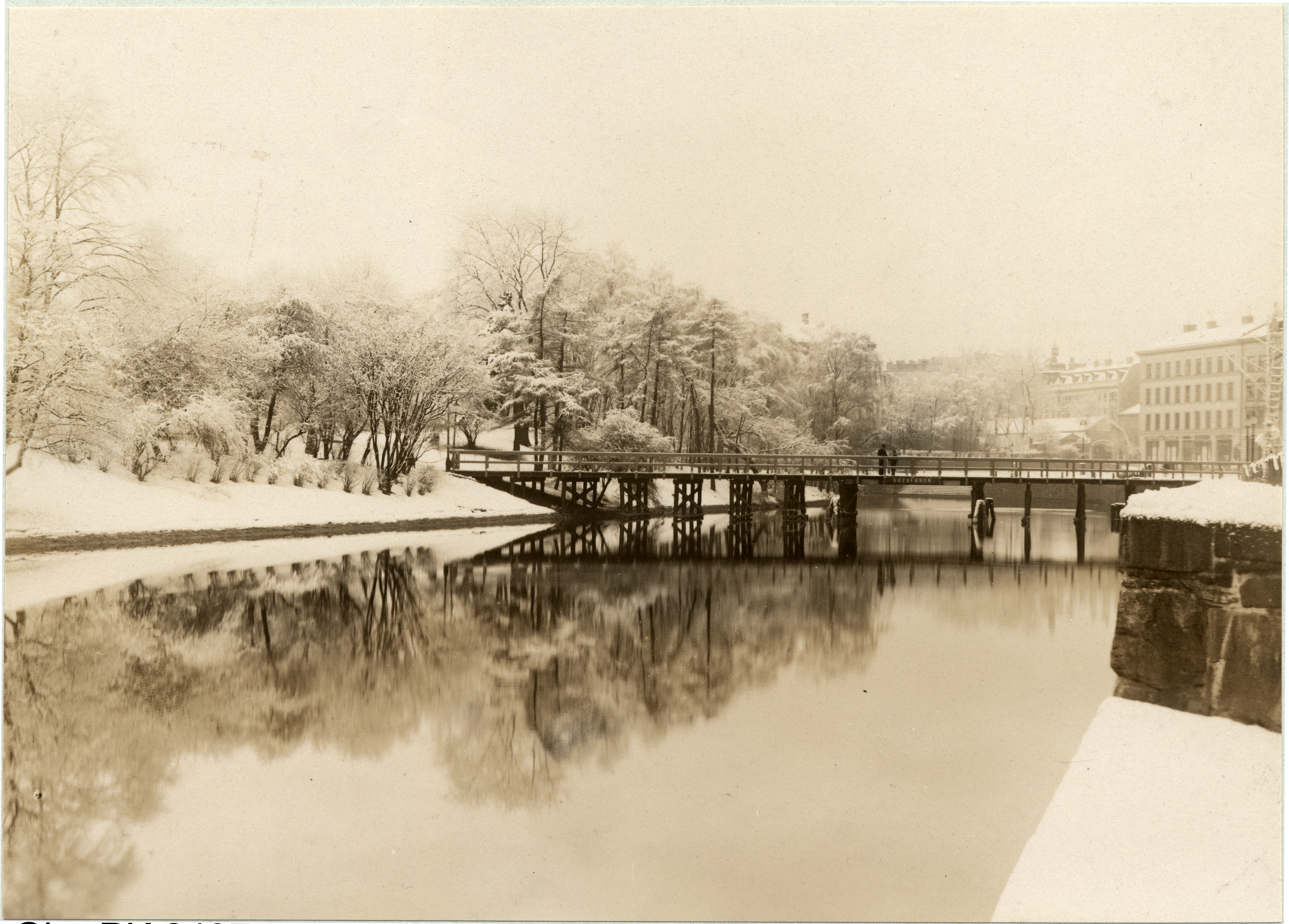
- Kungsparken in winter
- Interactive map of Kungsparken, Gothenburg
- Location: Gothenburg, Sweden
- Coordinates: 57°42′3.74″N 11°58′2.85″E
- Opened: Mid-1850
- Owner: Västra Götaland Regional Council
- Status: Open year round

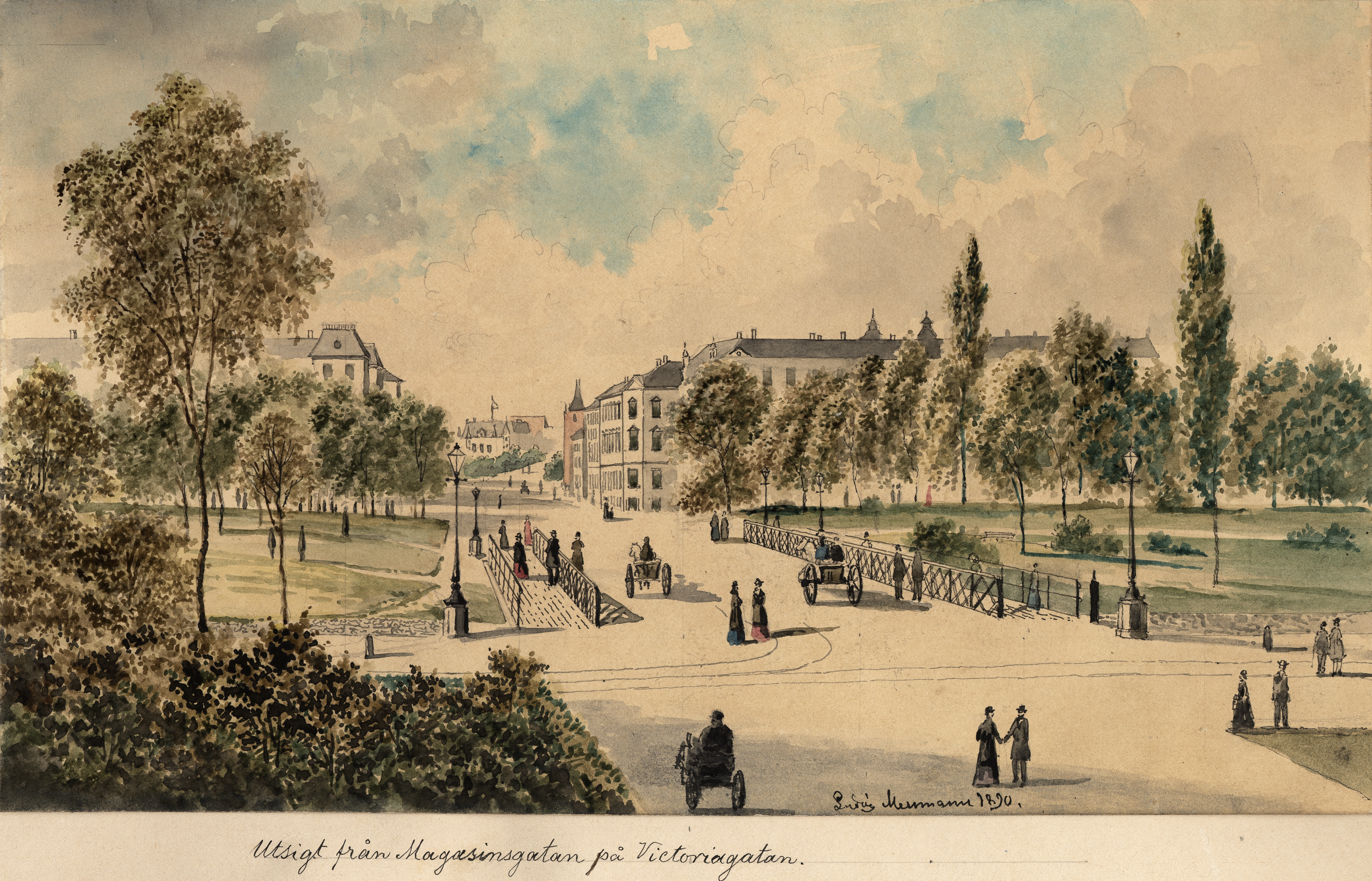
Old painting of Kungsparken in Gothenburg

Kungsparken (Swedish for King's park), originally Kungsportsparken, is a 13-hectare park behind Stora Teatern in Gothenburg, which encloses most of Nya Allén walkway, and constitutes a so-called park district. Kungsparken was built in several stages between 1839 and 1861.

In the 1940s and 1950s, the park was a meeting place for the city's homosexual men.

== See also ==
- Bältespännarparken
