= Kings Park =

Kings Park or King's Park may refer to:

== Populated places ==
- King's Park, Glasgow, a district
- King's Park, Hong Kong, a neighborhood in the Kowloon area
  - King's Park (constituency), a constituency of Hong Kong
- King's Park (ward), an electoral ward in the London Borough of Hackney
- Kings Park, New South Wales, a suburb of Sydney
- Kings Park, New York, a census-designated place on Long Island
- Kings Park, South Australia, a suburb of Adelaide
- Kings Park, Victoria, a suburb of Melbourne
- Kings Park, Virginia, a suburban community west of Washington, D.C.

== Parks ==
- Kings Park, Boscombe
- Kings Park, Western Australia, in Perth
- King's Park, in Winnipeg (Fort Richmond area)
- Another name for Holyrood Park in Edinburgh

== Other uses ==
- King's Park F.C., a defunct football club in Stirling, Scotland
- Kings Park Rangers F.C., a football club in Great Cornard, Suffolk
- Kings Park Psychiatric Center, a former mental institution located in Kings Park, New York
- Kings Park Sporting Precinct, Durban, South Africa
- Kings Park Stadium, a rugby stadium in Durban, South Africa
