= Rosa 'Charlotte Brownell' =

Yellow blend hybrid tea rose cultivar

- Genus: Rosa hybrid
- Hybrid parentage: 'Unnamed seedling' x Peace
- Cultivar group: Hybrid tea
- Breeder: Brownell
- Origin: United States, before 1971

Rosa 'Charlotte Brownell' is a yellow-blend Hybrid tea rose cultivar, bred by American rose breeder Dr. Walter Brownell, before 1971. The rose is part of a series the Brownell family developed to withstand the sub-zero temperatures of winter in Rhode Island.

== Description ==
'Charlotte Brownell' is a medium, bushy, spreading Hybrid tea rose, 3 to 4 ft (0.91–1.22 m) in height, with a 3 to 4 ft (0.91–1.22 m) spread. Its flowers are large in size, 4 to 5 in (100–130 mm), with a high-centered, globular, double (17-25 petals) bloom form. Flower color is a light yellow with pink edges. 'Charlotte Brownell' blooms are carried mostly singly or in small clusters throughout the season. Leaves are glossy and medium green. The plant is a very vigorous grower.

== History ==
Rosa 'Charlotte Brownell' is a Hybrid tea rose created by American rose breeder, Dr. Walter D. Brownell in Little Compton, Rhode Island. He and his wife, Josephine, and their son, H.C. developed hardy sub-zero roses from the 1920s to the 1950s, to survive and flourish in Rhode Island's frigid winters. /Brownell developed 'Charlotte Brownell' by crossing and unnamed seedling and 'Peace'.
