= World Federation of Rose Societies =

International umbrella organization

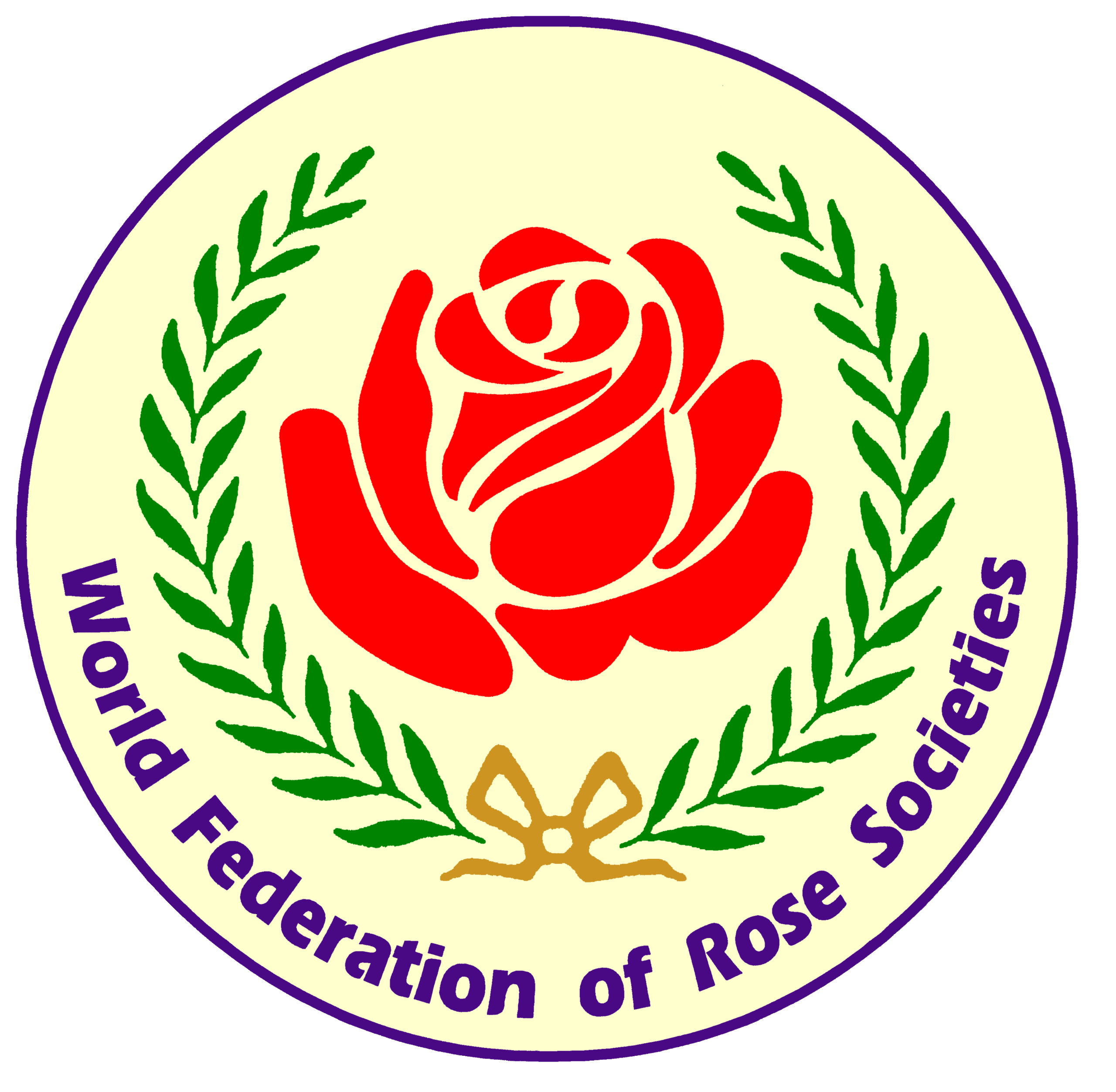
World Federation of Rose Societies Logo

The World Federation of Rose Societies (WFRS) is an umbrella association of (as of 2015) 39-member countries' national rose societies.

Although founded in 1968 in London by 8 constituent countries' rose societies, the WFRS did not have a first meeting until 1971, held in New Zealand.

The WFRS maintains or oversees: a Rose Hall of Fame as well as an Old Rose Hall of Fame (an entry in which has been characterised as an honour "as coveted as Michelin's four stars" for rose aficionados); a World Rose directory; a Rose Locator Database targeting the location of rose cultivars; a Breeder's Club; a "garden of excellence" award; the selection of "world's favourite rose" by vote of delegates of its member-countries; a World Rose Show held every three years; and collects world news on the subject of roses. It also publishes an annual Rose Directory and a bi-annual World Rose News bulletin.

== Members ==
Society country	Society name	Year established
South Korea	Korea Rose Society	2009
Argentina	Rose Society of Argentina	1951
Australia	National Rose Society of Australia	1972
Austria	Österreichische Rosenfreunde in der Österreichischen Gartenbau-Gesellschaft	N/A
Belgium	Société Royale Nationale 'Les Amis de la Rose'/ Koninklijke Nationale Maatschappij "De Vrienden van de Roos"	1926
Bermuda	Bermuda Rose Society	1954
Canada	Canadian Rose Society	1913
Chile	Asociación Chilena de la Rosa	1998
Republic of China	Chinese Rose Society	1986
Czech Republic	Czech Rosa Club	1968
Denmark	Det Danske Rosenselskab/ The Danish Rose Society (DDRS)	1968
Finland	Suomen Ruususeura r.y. - Finska Rosensällskapet r.f.	1989
France	Société Française des Roses	1896
Germany	Gesellschaft Deutscher Rosenfreunde e.V.	1883
England	Royal National Rose Society	1876
Greece	The Hellenic Rose Society	1996
Hungary	Hungarian Rose-Friends Society	--
Iceland	Icelandic Rose Society (IRS)	2002
India	Indian Rose Federation	1979
Israel	The Wohl Rose Park of Jerusalem	--
Italy	Associazione Italiana della Rosa	1964
Japan	Japan Rose Society(日本ばら会)	1948
Luxembourg	Lëtzebuerger Rousefrënn / Association Grand-Ducale des Amis de la Rose / Luxembourg Rose Society	1980
Monaco	Société des Roses de Monaco	--
Netherlands	De Nederlandse Rozenvereniging	1966
New Zealand	New Zealand Rose Society	1931
Northern Ireland	Rose Society of Northern Ireland	1964
Norway	Norwegian Rose Society	1982
Pakistan	Pakistan National Rose Society	--
Romania	Asociatia Amicii Rozelor din Romania	1990
Russia	Russian Association of Rosarians	2007
Serbia	Royal Serbian Rose Society (Kraljevsko Udruzenje Ljubitelja Ruza Srbije)	2008
Slovakia	Slovak National Rose Society	--
Slovenia	Drustvo Ljubiteljev Vrtnic Slovenije (Slovenian Rose Society)	--
South Africa	Federation of Rose Societies of South Africa	1980
Spain	Asociación Española de la Rose	1996
Sweden	Svenska Rosensällskapet/The Swedish Rose Society	1987
Switzerland	Gesellschaft Schweizerischer Rosenfreunde (GSRF)	1959
United States	American Rose Society	1892
Uruguay	Asociación Uruguaya de la Rosa	1983
United States	Portland Rose Society	1889
