= Łękno =

Neighbourhood of Szczecin, Poland

- Municipal neighbourhood
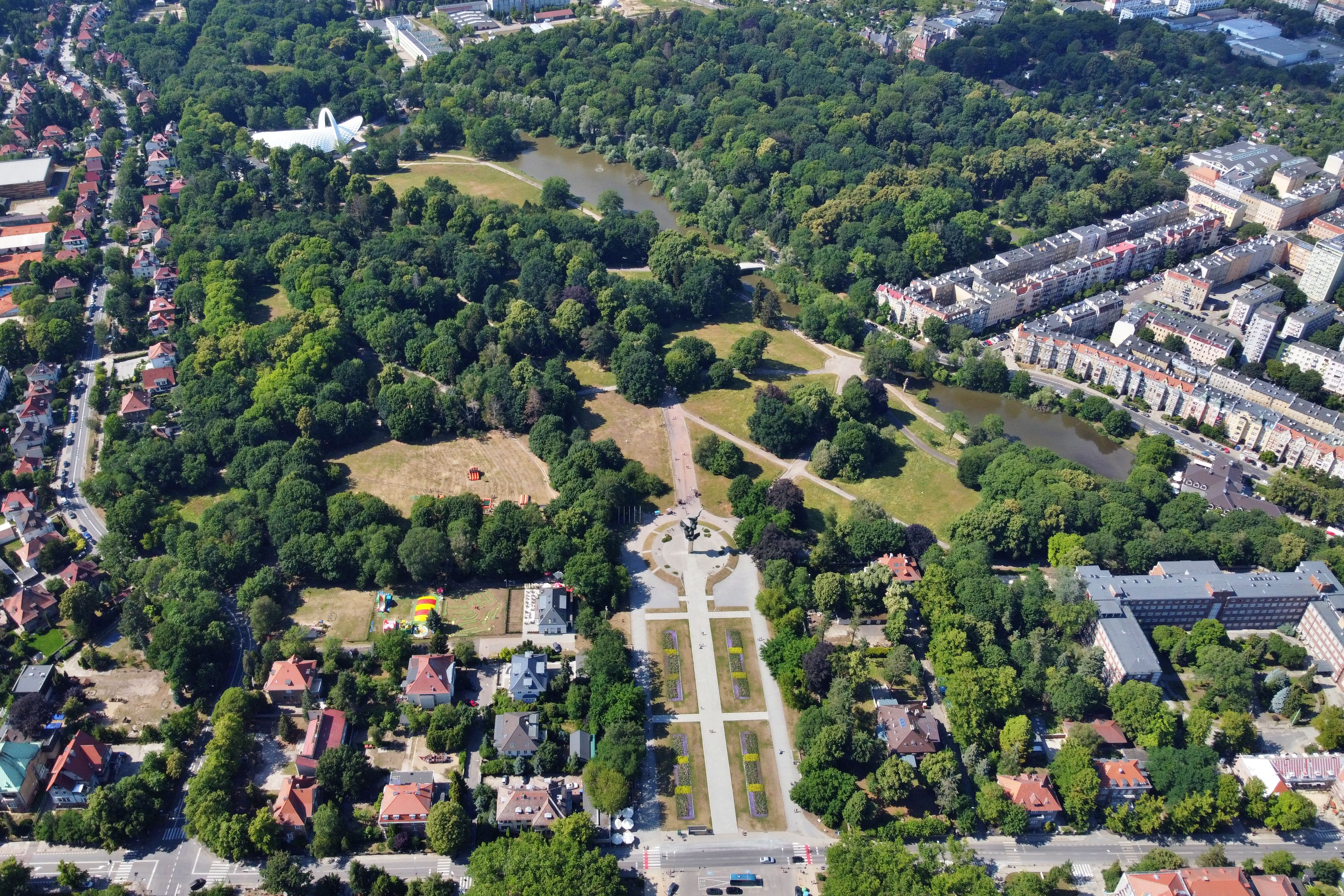
- The Jan Kasprowicz Park and Bright Meadows Square in Łękno.

- Location within Szczecin

- Map of Łękno
- Coordinates: 53°26′36.6″N 14°31′46.68″E
- Country: Poland
- Voivodeship: West Pomeranian
- City and county: Szczecin
- District: Downtown
- Seat: 12 Bogumiły Street, suit 9

Area
  - Total: 1 km^{2} (0.39 sq mi)

Population (2025)
  - Total: 2,915
  - Density: 2,900/km^{2} (7,500/sq mi)
- Time zone: UTC+1 (CET)
  - Summer (DST): UTC+2 (CEST)
- Area code: +48 91
- Car plates: ZS

Łękno (Polish: [wɛŋkˈnɔ]; German until 1945: Westend ([ˈvɛstʔ.ɛnt]), also known as Łekno (Polish: [wɛkˈnɔ]), is a municipal neighbourhood of the city of Szczecin, Poland, within the Downtown district. It is a low-rise housing estate with historic villas. The neighbourhood has an area of 1 km^{2}, and in 2022, had a population of 2,915 people. It features the Jan Kasprowicz Park, the largest urban green space in the city, as well as the Summer Theatre, one of the largest amphitheatres in the country.

The area was settled in the 14th century, and in 1817, it became known as Friedrichshof, after its owner Friedrich Carow, who built there his manor house. In 1871, the area was sold for the development of the housing estate of Westend, with villas for the upper class. The Jan Kasprowicz Park was opened in 1900, the Bright Meadows Square in 1927. The neighbourhood was incorporated into the city in 1910.

== History ==
Within the boundaries of modern Łękno were discovered remains of a human settlement dating to the late Bronze Age, and the Hallstatt culture of the early Iron Age.

In the High Middle Ages, a portion of the Osówka stream was dammed during the construction of two gristmills, forming lake Rusałka. It received its current shape in 1885, during another damming works.

In the 14th century, in the area was founded a small farming community. In 1792, it was acquired by a local politician Friedrich Carow, who built there a manor house, and named it Friedrichshof in 1817. The estate also included around 200 ha of farmland and forest. In 1818, on the fields near the settlement was opened a military training area. In 1864, part of Friedrichshof, was parcelled and sold for the development of housing. In 1871, rest of the estate, together with nearby settlement of Schwankenheim, was sold for 300,000 thalers to company Westend Stettin Bauverein auf Aktien, owned by Johannes Quistorp, Heinrich Christoph Burmeister, and August Horn. Throughout 1870s, there was developed a housing estate Westend, with villas for the upper class. It also included part of modern neighbourhood of Downtown-North. In 1890, to the north begun being developed the suburb estate of Neu Westend (New Westend), now known as Pogodno. The area was incorporated into Szczecin in 1910.

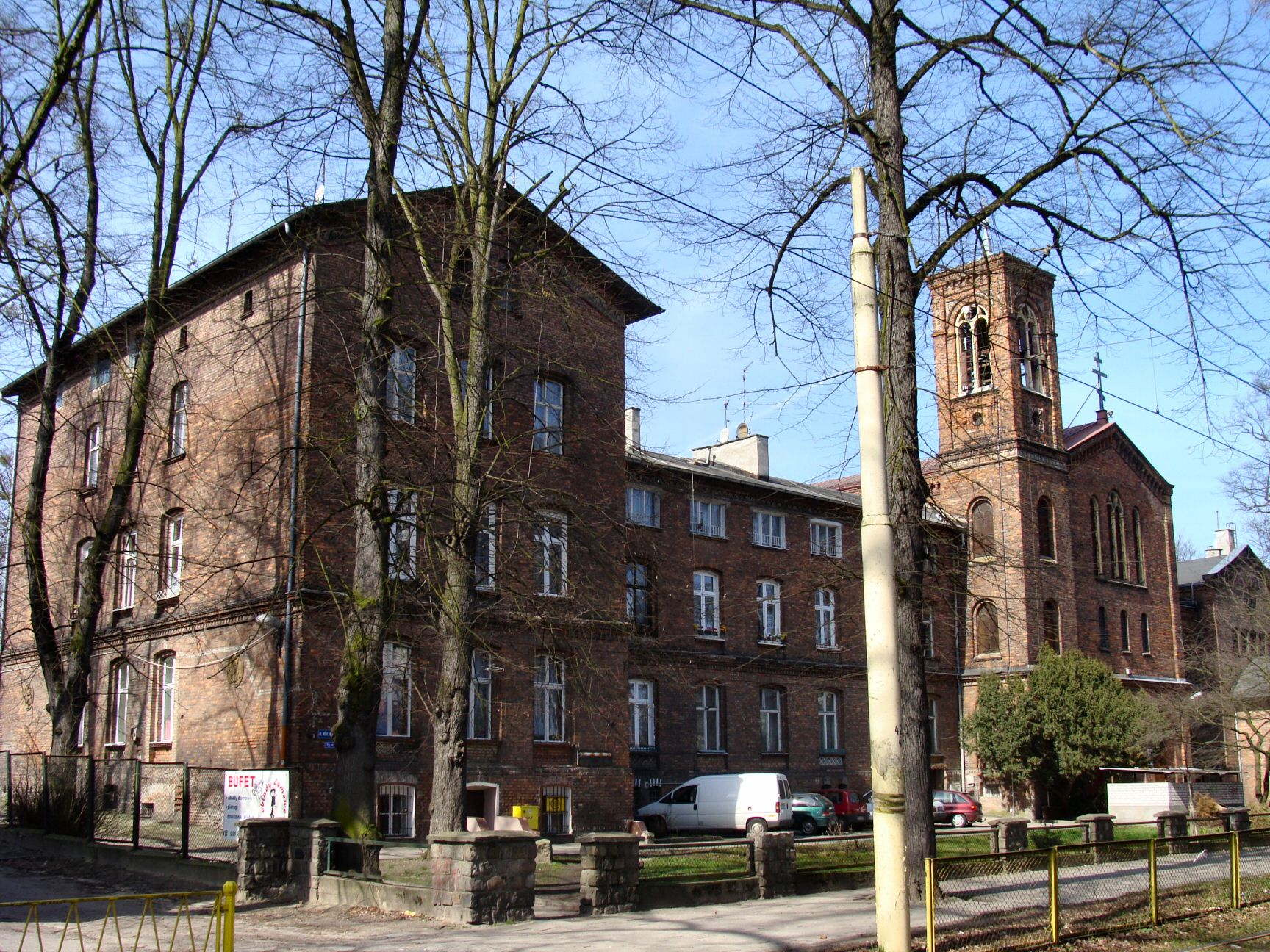
The main building of the Bethany hospital complex.

In 1871, in the area were opened the Bethany hospital complex, run by a diaconate, and located between Wawrzyniaka, Mickiewicza, and Beyzyma Streets. In 1891 next to it was also opened a small cemetery, currently destroyed. From 1945 to 1992, the complex was used as a Soviet military hospital, being closed afterwards. In 1957, a building at 43 Mickiewicza Street, was adopted into the Church of the Protection of Virgin Mary, belonging to the Ukrainian Greek Catholic Church denomination, and in 1961, nearby 7 Wawrzyniaka Street begun housing the Bethany commune of the Pentecostal Church. In 1999, a building at 47 Mickiewicza Street became headquarters of the Academy of European Integration.

In 1898, at Majdańskiego Street was opened the Szczecin Łękno railway station, which operated until 2002. Currently, it is located within the neighbourhood of Arkońskie-Niemierzyn.

In 1900, on the lands donated by Johannes Quistorp, was developed the Jan Kasprowicz Park (originally known as the Quistorp Park), which, with the area of around 27 ha, became the largest urban park in Szczecin. It was formed to the east of current Słowackiego Street, in the Niemierzyn Valley and around lake Rusałka, and forming part of the Ueckermünde Heath. In 1927, to the south, at current Skargi Street, was also developed the Bright Meadows Square (originally known as the Quistorp Meadow). In the 1930s, within the park was opened the Summer Theatre with wooden openair stage. In 1976, in its place was built a new concrete building, becoming one of the largest amphitheatres in Poland. It was renovated in 2022.

Additionally, around 1926, to the north of the park, begun being developed the Szczecin Botanical Garden, with an alpine garden and greenhouses growing exotic plants. The works were halted by the outbreak of the Second World War, and it was eventually finished in the 1950s. In 1928, as part of its complex, next to Zaleskiego Street, was opened the Różanka Rose Garden. It was renovated in 2007.

In 1947, following the incorporation of the city into Poland, Westend was renamed to Łekno, though it is commonly referred to as Łękno instead.

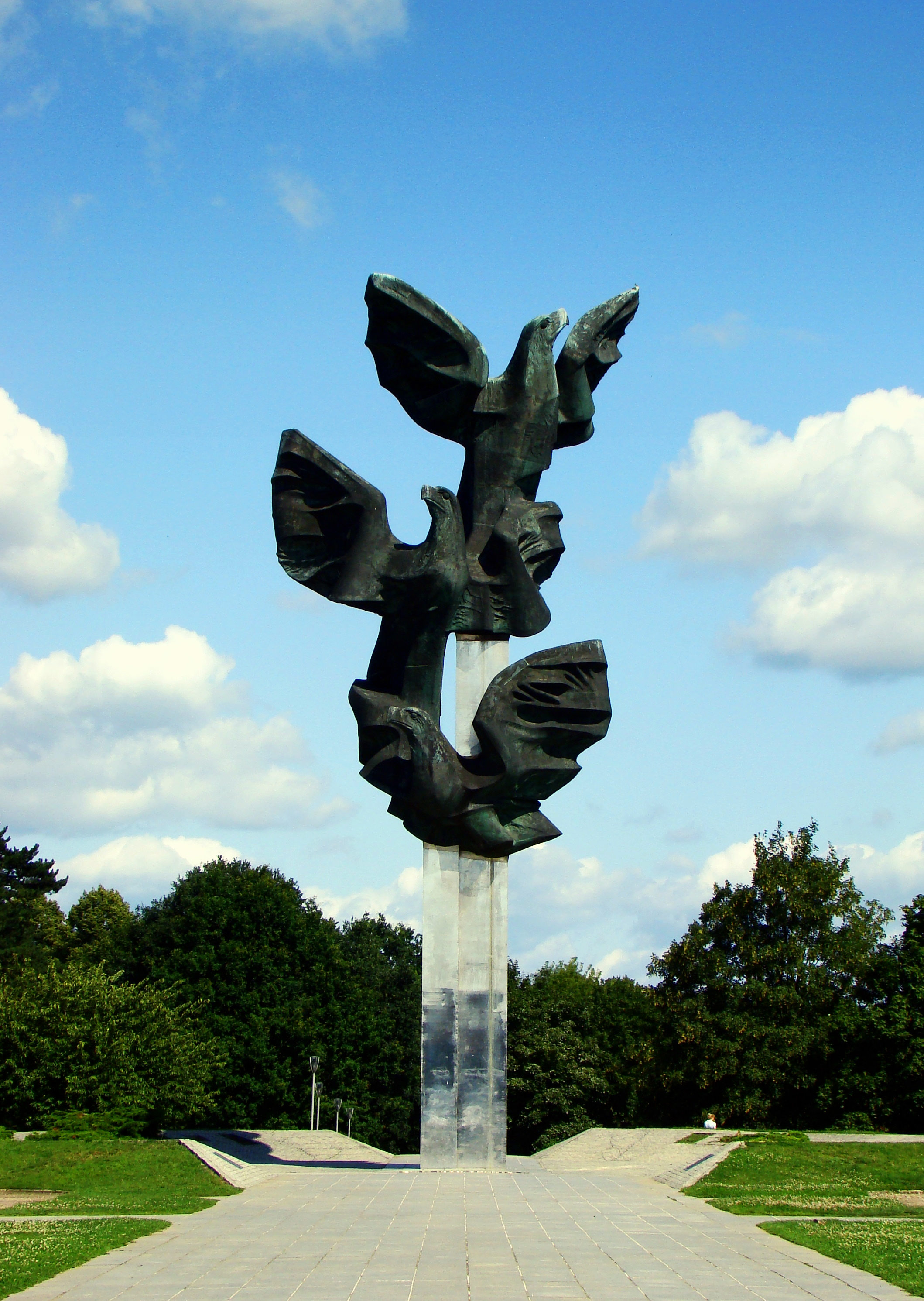
The Monument to the Polish Endeavour, unveiled in 1979

In 1979, at the boundary of Kasprowicz Park and Bright Meadows was unveiled the Monument to the Polish Endeavour. Designed by Gustaw Zemła, it consists of three bronze colossal statues of eagles, installed on stainless steel pillars, with the total height of 22.5 m. It is meant to represent three generations of Polish residents of the city. On 11 June 1987, Pope John Paul II performed a mass in front of the monument, during his third visit to Poland.

In 1987, at 2 Papieża Pawła VI Street, was opened the new building of the Higher Theological Seminary. In 1998, it became a branch of the Adam Mickiewicz University in Poznań, and in 2003, it was turned into the Faculty of Theology of the University of Szczecin.

In 1990, following the administrative reform in the city, Łękno became one of its neighbourhoods governed by a locally elected council. Southern historic portion of the neighbourhood, between Mickiewicza, Skargi, Monte Casino, Wielkopolska, and Piątego Lipca Streets, became part of Downtown-North. That year, Łękno had around 5,000 residents. In 2010, it had a population of 3,505 people, and 2022, a population of 2,949 people.

== Characteristics ==
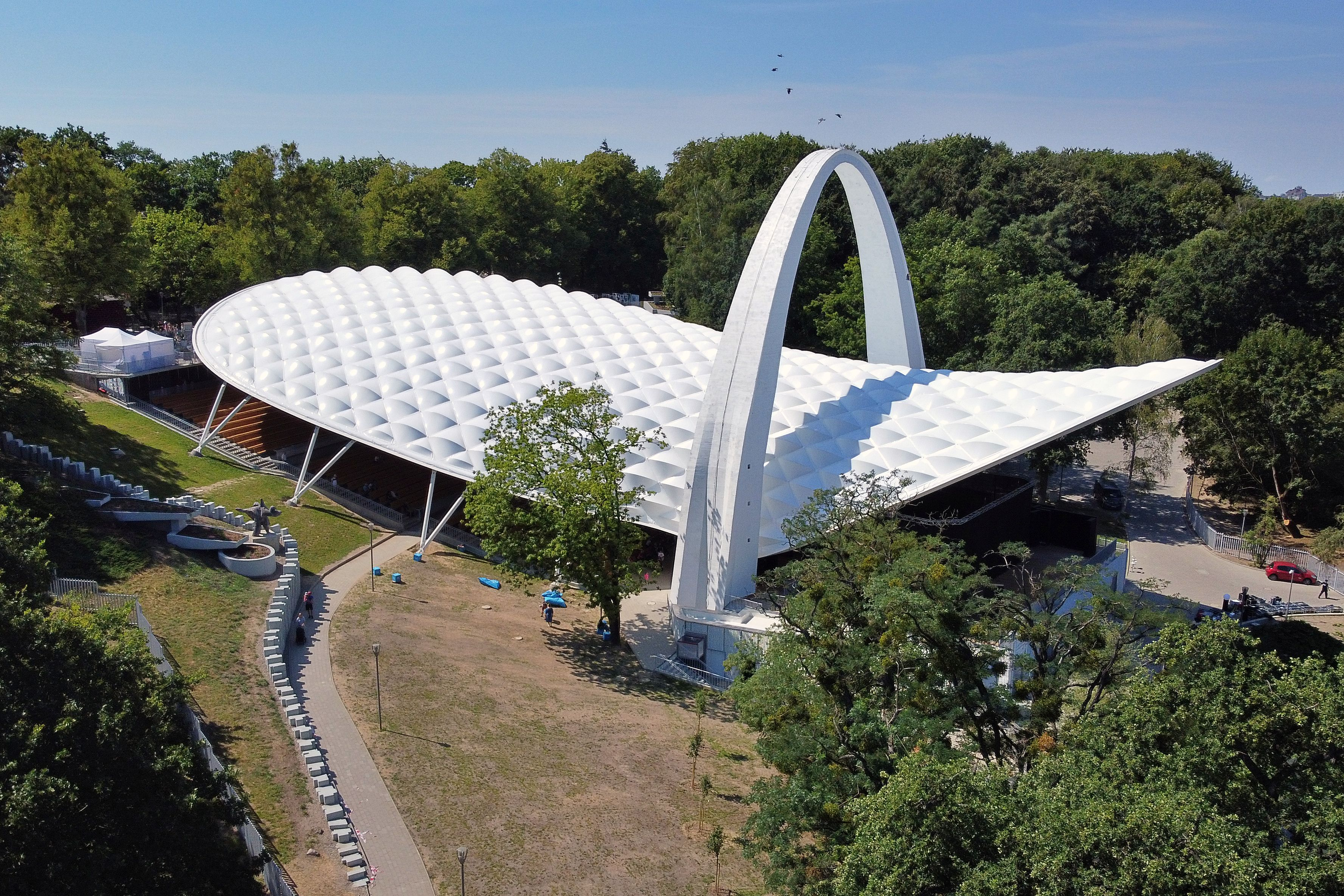
The Summer Theatre, one of the largest amphitheatres in Poland.

Łękno is a housing estate, mostly consists of historic villas. Within its boundaries, to the east of Słowackiego Street, is located the Jan Kasprowicz Park, the largest urban park in the city, with an area of around 27 ha. It features lake Rusałka, Osówka stream, Niemierzyn Valley, and its woodland forms part of the Ueckermünde Heath. There also located the Summer Theatre, one of the largest a amphitheatres in Poland. To the south, the park borders the Bright Meadows Square at Skargi Street. At their boundary stands the Monument to the Polish Endeavour, designed by Gustaw Zemła in 1979. It consists of three bronze colossal statues of eagles, installed on stainless steel pillars, with the total height of 22.5 m. The monument represent three generations of Polish residents of the city. Additionally, to the north, park borders the Różanka Rose Garden, which is part of the Szczecin Botanical Garden. Other urban green placed in the neighbourhood includes the Gałczyński Square and Badetko Square at Polish Armed Forces Avenue.

Additionally, within the neighbourhood are also present the Academy of European Integration at 47 Mickiewicza Street, and the Faculty of Theology of the University of Szczecin at 2 Papieża Pawła VI Street, was opened the new building of the Higher Theological Seminary. At 43 Mickiewicza Street, is also placed the Church of the Protection of Virgin Mary, belonging to the Ukrainian Greek Catholic Church denomination, and the Bethany commune of the Pentecostal Church denomination.

At 19 Skarki Street is also located the civilian department of the District Court of Szczecin.

== Government ==
Łękno is one of the municipal neighbourhoods of Szczecin, governed by a locally elected council with 15 members. Its headquarters are located at 12 Bogumiły Street.

== Boundaries ==
The neighbourhood is located between Niemierzyńska Street, Papieża Pawła VI Street, Słowackiego Street, around Kasprowicz Park, Bright Meadows Square, Skargi Street, Wawrzyniaka Street, Mickiewicza Street, Sienkiewicza Street, and tracks of the railway line no. 406. It borders Arkońskie-Niemierzyn, Niebuszewo-Bolinko, Downtown-North, Turzyn, and Pogodno. It has a total area of 1 km^{2}.
