= Śródmieście-Północ =

Neighbourhood of Szczecin, Poland

- Municipal neighbourhood
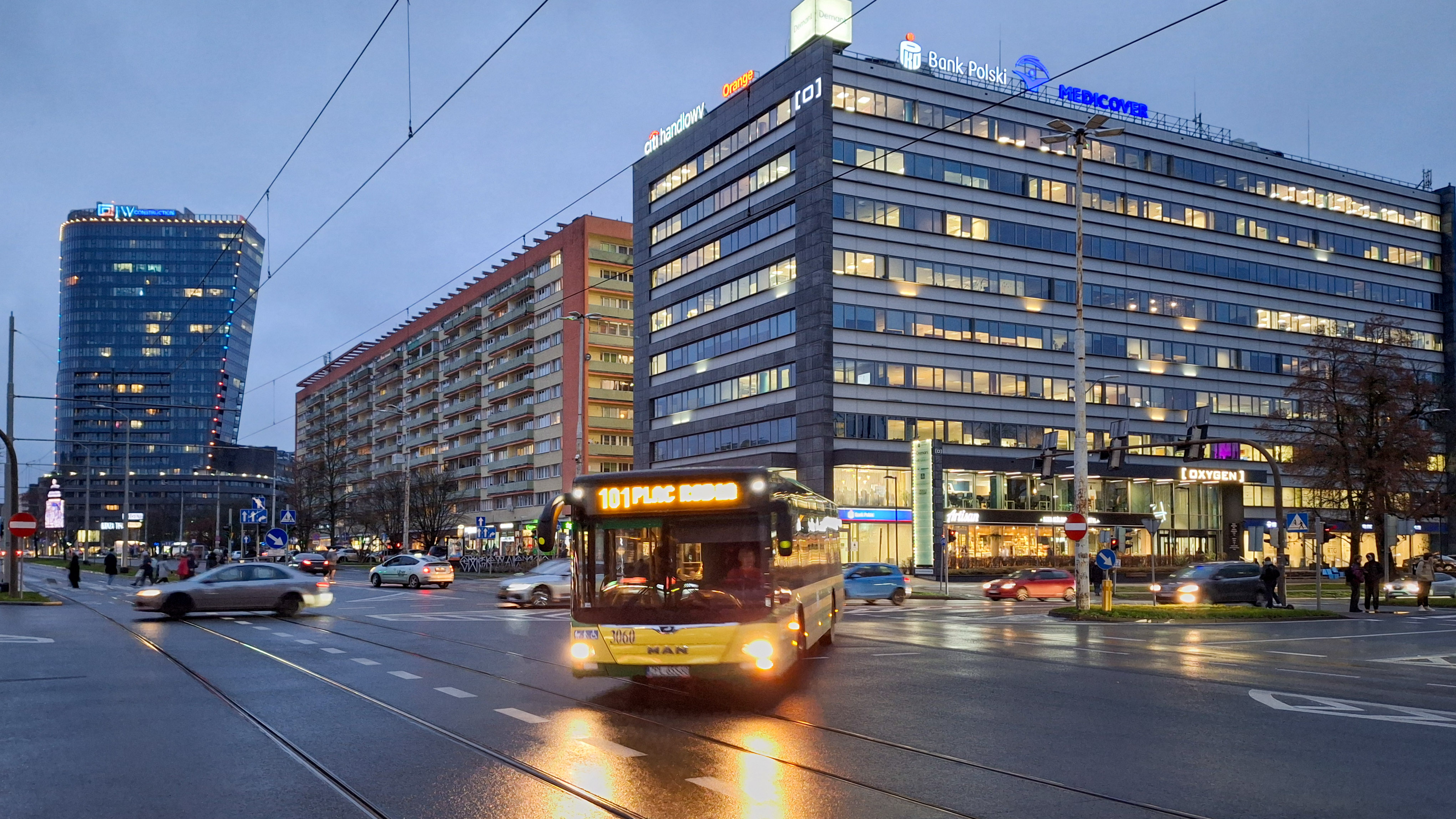
- The Oxygen office building and the Hanza Tower skyscraper in Śródmieście-Północ.

- Location within Szczecin

- Map of Śródmieście-Północ
- Coordinates: 53°26′17.4″N 14°32′31.6″E
- Country: Poland
- Voivodeship: West Pomeranian
- City and county: Szczecin
- District: Downtown
- Seat: 42 Pope John Paul II Avenue

Area
  - Total: 1.41 km^{2} (0.54 sq mi)

Population (2025)
  - Total: 10,170
  - Density: 7,210/km^{2} (18,700/sq mi)
- Time zone: UTC+1 (CET)
  - Summer (DST): UTC+2 (CEST)
- Area code: +48 91
- Car plates: ZS

Śródmieście-Północ (Polish: [ɕrudˈmjɛɕ.t͡ɕɛ ˈpuw.nɔt͡s]; lit. 'Downtown-North') is a municipal neighbourhood of the city of Szczecin, Poland, within the Downtown district. Its western half features low-rise housing with villas, while the eastern half, mid-rise apartment buildings. The neighbourhood has an area of 1.41 km^{2}, and in 2025, was inhabited by 10,170 people. The neighbourhood includes the city hall, the Bright Meadows Square, and skyscraper Hanza Tower.

The area was developed in the 19th century, with construction of tenement houses, and villas of the housing estate of Westend (now known as Łękno). They were incorporated into the city in 1875 and 1910 respectively. Most of the tenements were destroyed during the Second World War, and were replaced by apartment buildings from the 1950s to the 1980s.

== History ==
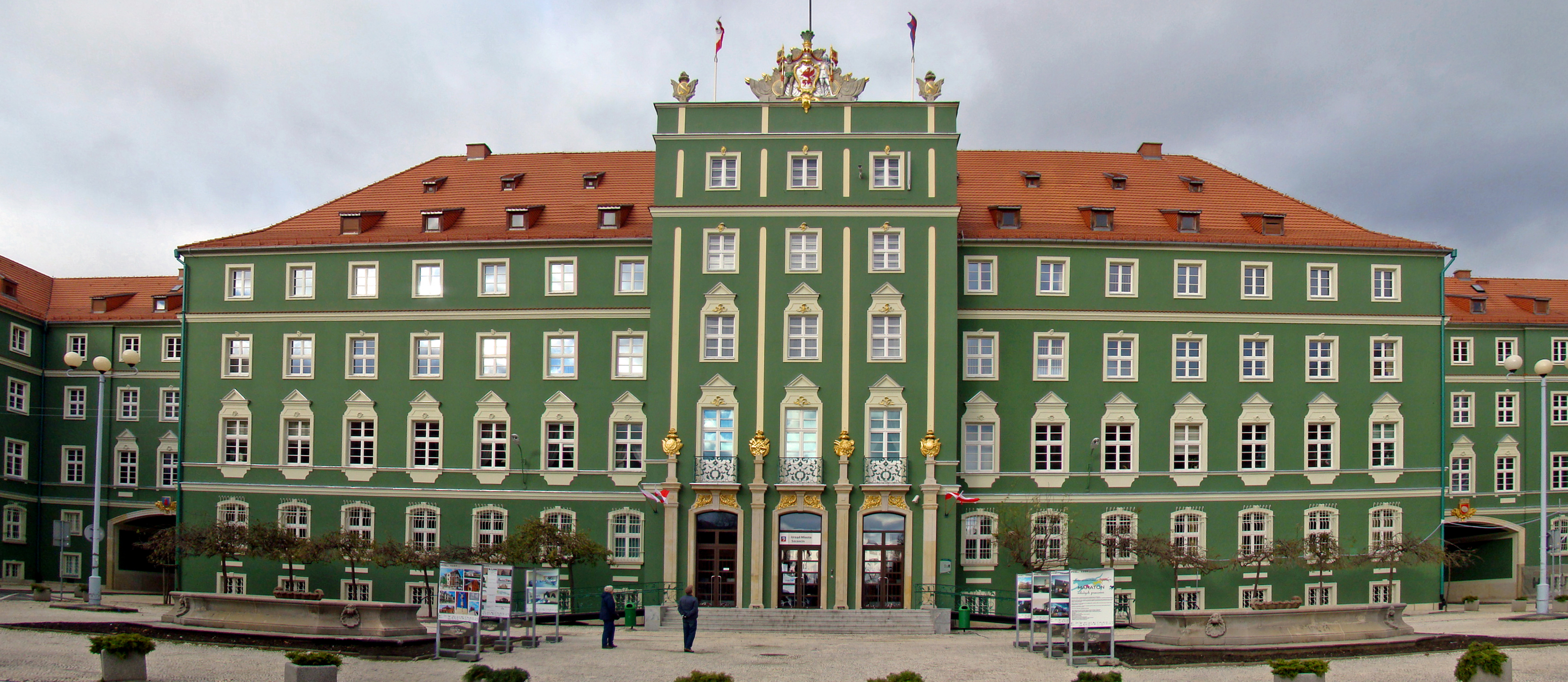
The Szczecin City Hall, constructed in 1927.

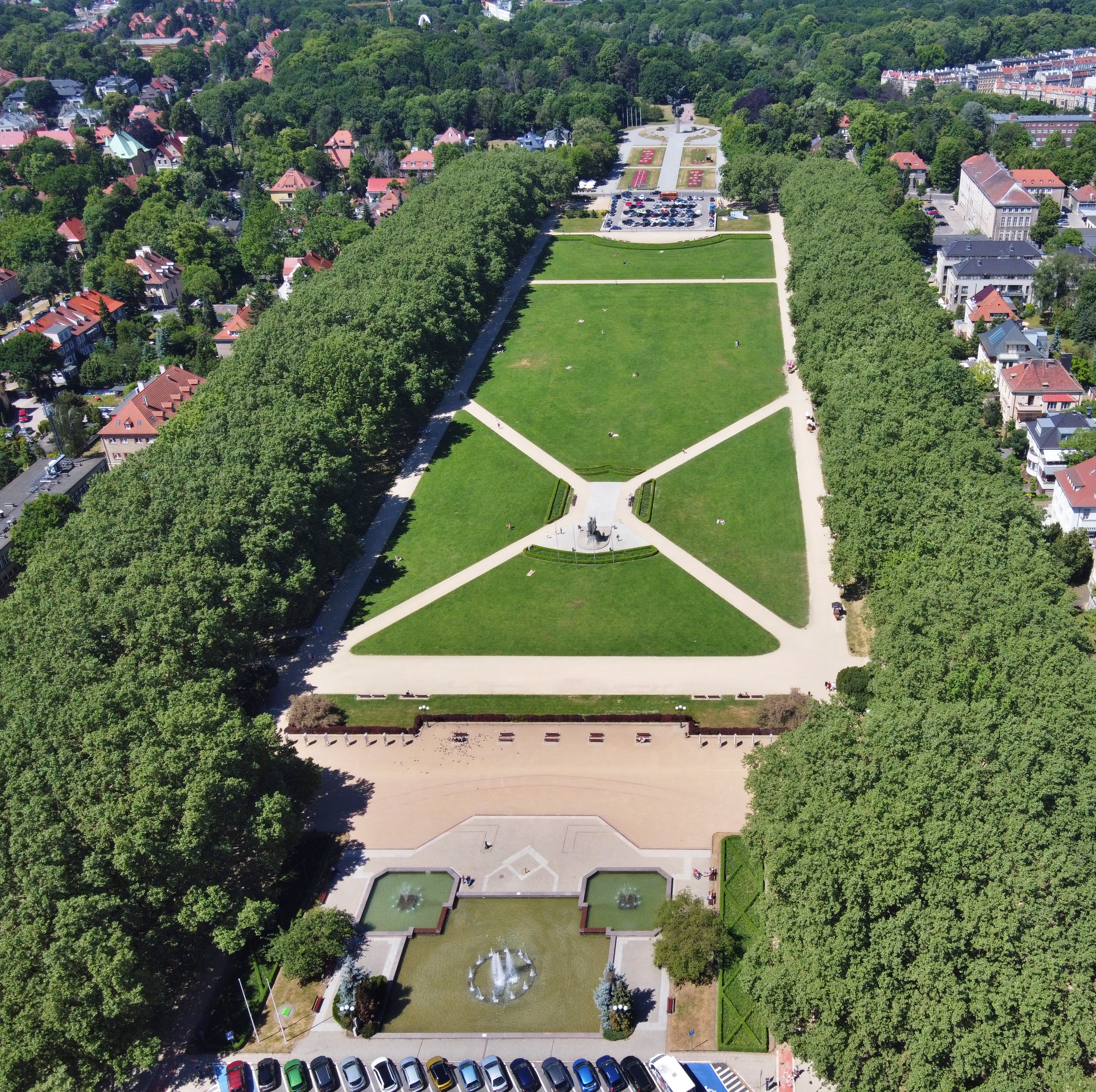
The Bright Meadows, opened in 1927.

In the 14th century, a small farming community was founded in the area. In 1792, it was acquired by a local politician Friedrich Carow, who built a manor house and named it Friedrichshof in 1817. The estate also included around 200 ha of farmland and forest, a portion of which is within the current boundaries of Śródmieście-Północ. In 1818, on the fields near the settlement was opened a military training area. In 1864, part of Friedrichshof, was parcelled and sold for the development of housing. In 1871, rest of the estate, together with the nearby settlement of Schwankenheim, was sold for 300,000 thalers to the company Westend Stettin Bauverein auf Aktien, owned by Johannes Quistorp, Heinrich Christoph Burmeister, and August Horn. Throughout the 1870s, a housing estate Westend (now known as Łękno), with villas for the upper class was developed there. This included the western half of modern Śródmieście-Północ. The area was incorporated into Szczecin in 1910.

In the second half of the 19th century, a series of tenement houses were constructed alongside the Emancipation Avenue (then Pölitzer Street). It was incorporated into the city in 1875.

In 1879, a horsecar depot complex was opened at the current 20 Skargi Street, coninsiding with the opening of the first line in the city, leading from building to the current Potulicka Street. In 1897 the horsecars were replaced with electric trams. The depot was closed down in 1994.

In 1900, between current Niedziałkowskiego, Niegolewskiego, Wielkopolska, and Wąska Streets was formed the Blücher Square, now known as the Theatre Square.

In 1927, on both sides of Skargi Street, on lands donated by Quistorp, was developed the Bright Meadows Square (originally known as the Quistorp Meadow), placed to the south of the Kasprowicz Park (then Quistorp Park). At its southern end, the headquarters building of the Provincial Assembly of the Province of Pomerania was also opened. Additionally, to the south, tenement houses were constructed between Feldczaka and Niedziałkowskiego Streets. From 1933 to 1945, the building was the local headquarters of the Nazi Party, and since 1945, it operates as the town hall. From 1953 to 2014, it also housed the Szczecin Philharmonic.

In 1931, at the current 28 Królowej Korony Polskiej, the Holy Family Church was opened, originally known as the Holy Cross Church, belonging to the evangelical denomination. It was bombed and burned down in 1945, during the Second World War. It was rebuilt after the war, being adopted for a provisional hospital, before being adopted into a Catholic church.

Westend survived the Second World War without major destruction. However, the buildings alongside Emancipation Avenue were destroyed. In their place were constructed new mid-rise apparent buildings, which first opened in 1958, and their development continued until the 1980s. This included the construction of the housing estate of Osiedle Grunwaldzkie (Grunwald Neighbourhood) in the 1960s, between Bazarowa Street, Żubrów Street, Malczewskiego Street, and Emancipation Avenue. Its buildings were constructed using a technique of assembling prefabricated concrete slabs, developed by the Szczecin University of Technology, and predating the wider use of the large-panel-system technology in the next decade.

In 1945, at 9, 10, and 11 Piotra Skargi Street was opened the 109th Military Hospital.

In the 1960s, the Voivodeship House of Sports, an indoor multisport arena, was built at 16 Wąska Street, next to the Theatre Square. In 2000, it was renamed to the Szczecin House of Sports, and in 2010, the Floating Area Olympic-size swimming pool was opened as part of the complex. The arena was demolished in 2023, with new building being opened in its place in 2026.

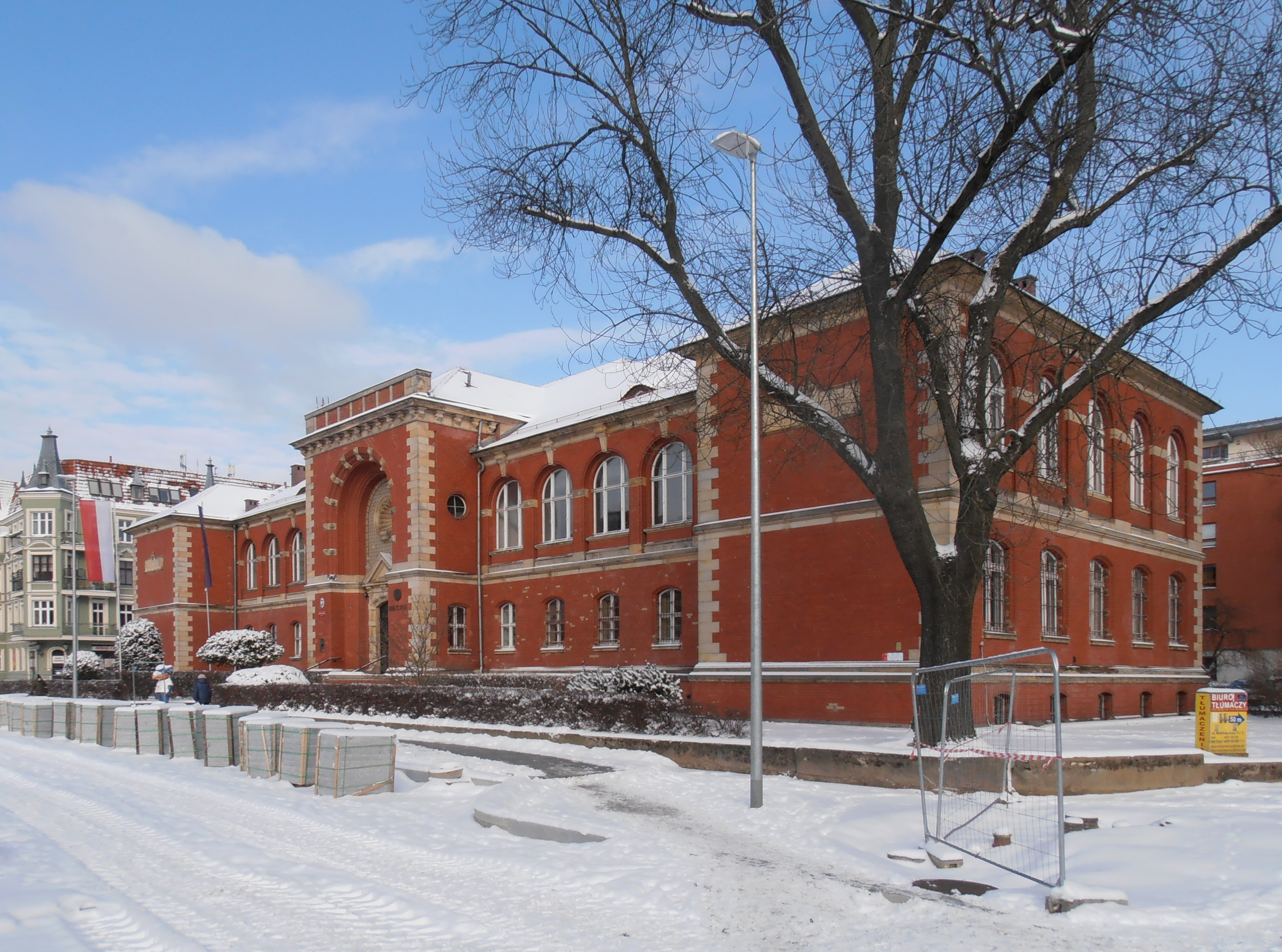
The rectorate building of the University of Szczecin, constructed in 1888.

In 1968, a former high school building at 22A Pope John Paul II Avenue, dating to 1888, was adopted to house the Higher School of Teaching, a state university run as a branch of the Adam Mickiewicz University in Poznań. In 1973, it formed an independent institution, called the Higher School of Education. In 1985, it merged with the Faculty of Economics and Transport Engineering of the Szczecin University of Technology, forming the University of Szczecin. The building began housing the Faculty of Natural Sciences, and in 1995, following renovations, became the university rectorate.

In 1979, at the northern boundary of the Bright Meadows was unveiled the Monument to the Polish Endeavour. Designed by Gustaw Zemła, it consists of three bronze colossal statues of eagles, installed on stainless steel pillars, with the total height of 22.5 m. It is meant to represent three generations of Polish residents of the city. It is currently located within the boundaries of the neighbourhood of Łękno. On 11 June 1987, Pope John Paul II performed a mass, during his third visit to Poland, with the altar being placed in front of the monument In 1987, in the park was placed his statue, designed by Czesław Dźwigaj and Stanisław Latour, in the commemoration the event.

In 1980, at 24 Niedziałkowskiego Street, the skyscraper of the Polish Radio and Television was opened, with the headquarters of the Polish Radio Szczecin and TVP3 Szczecin, measuring 65 m. It was sold in 2015, and following the renovations, reopened in 2024 as an apartment building, under the name Sky Garden. Its façade was changed, receiving an irregular shape with the addition of viewing terraces, and its height was extended to 72 m. It continues to house the television station, and until 2025, housed the radio.

In 1990, following the administrative reform in the city, it was divided into the municipal neighbourhoods governed by locally elected councils, with Śródmieście-Północ becoming one of them.

In 1995, at 1 Victims of Katyn Square, at the corner of Unisławy and Wielkopolska Streets, the monastery of the Dominican Order was opened. Between 1997 and 2009, it was expanded with the construction of the St. Dominic Church.

In 1997, at 15 Monte Casino Street was opened the Higher School of Humanities of the Association for Adult Education, a private university with faculties in humanities and social sciences.

In 1999, the shopping centre Fala, with a store area of 4,500 m^{2}, was opened at 44A Emancipation Avenue.

In 2009, at the Theatre Square, was opened the new building of the Pleciuga Puppet Theatre.

In 2010, the office building Oxygen was opened at 26 Malczewskiego Street.

In 2021, at 50 Emancipation Avenue was constructed the Hanza Tower, a 27-storey residential skyscraper, and one of the tallest buildings in the city, measuring 100 m.

In 2023, the new headquarters building of the West Pomeranian Voivodeship Marshal Office was opened at 40 Piłsudskiego Street.

== Housing and economy ==
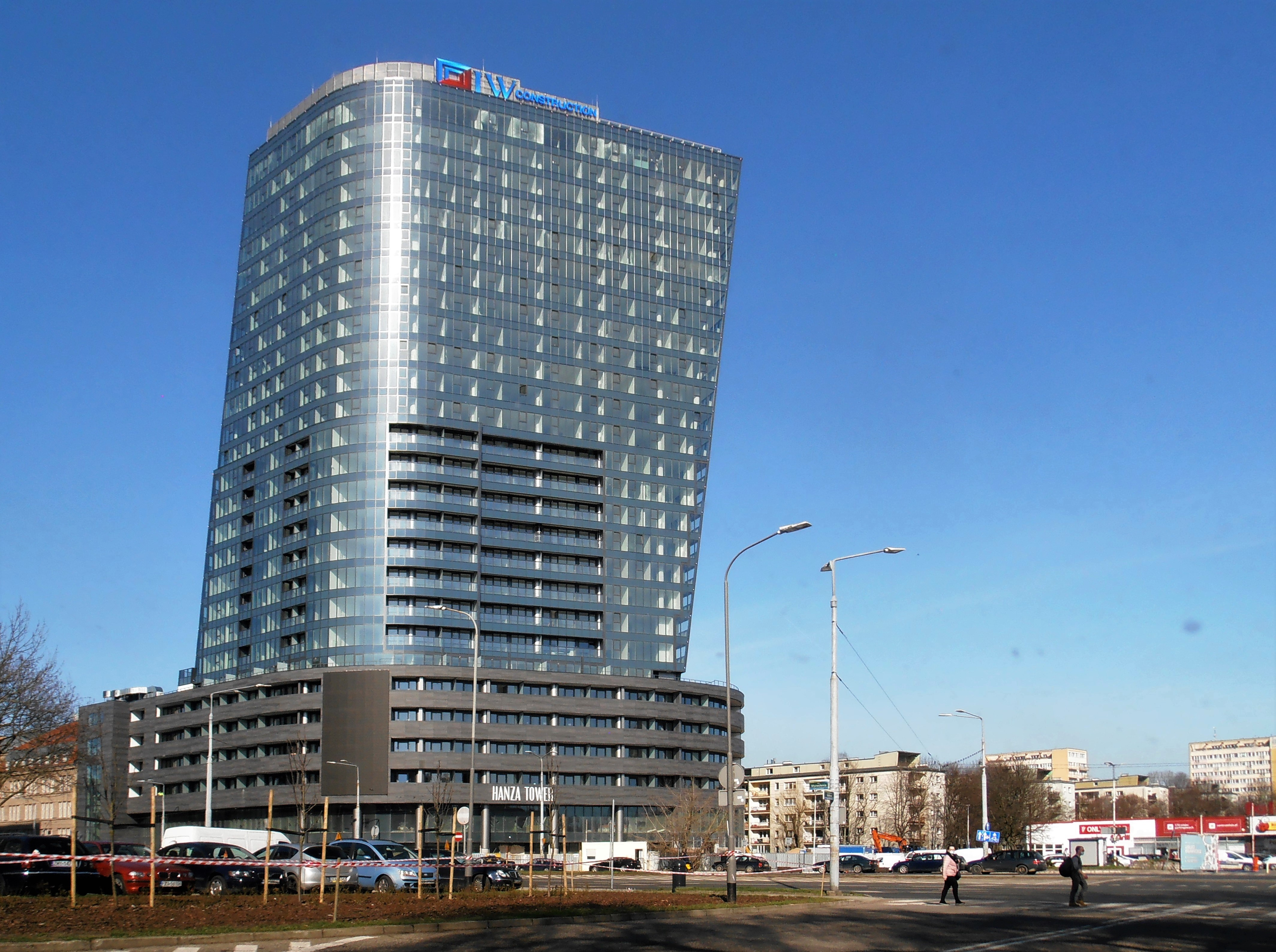
Hanza Tower skyscraper.

The western half of the neighbourhood, centred on Polish Armed Forces Avenue, features a low-rise housing with villas, some dating to the 1880s. The eastern half, centred on Emancipation Avenue, features mid-rise apartment buildings, from the second half of the 20th century, with some historic tenements from the 19th century. The latter includes the housing estate of Osiedle Grunwaldzkie (Grunwald Neighbourhood), located between Bazarowa Street, Żubrów Street, Malczewskiego Street, and Emancipation Avenue. At Skargi Street is located the Bright Meadows Square, a garden surrounded by villas. It features the statue of Pope John Paul II, designed by Czesław Dźwigaj and Stanisław Latour.

At 50 Emancipation Avenue is located the Hanza Tower, a 27-storey residential skyscraper with a height of 100 m The neighbourhood also includes the Sky Garden, a 72-metre-tall residential skyscraper.

At 44A Emancipation Avenue, is placed the shopping centre Fala, with a store area of 4,500 m^{2}. At 26 Malczewskiego Street is also located the office building Oxygen.

== Government ==
Śródmieście-Północ is one of the municipal neighbourhoods of Szczecin, governed by a locally elected council with 21 members. Its headquarters are located at 42 Pope John Paul II Avenue.

The neighbourhood also includes the city hall at 1 Home Army Square, and West Pomeranian Voivodeship Marshal Office at 40 Piłsudskiego Street.

== Higher education ==
Within the neighbourhood is located the rectorate building of the University of Szczecin at 22A Pope John Paul II Avenue, as well as its Faculty of Physical, Mathematics and Natural Sciences at 15 Wielkopolska Street. The neighbourhood also includes the Higher School of Humanities of the Association for Adult Education at 15 Monte Casino Street, a private university with faculties in humanities and social sciences.

== Culture ==
At 1 Theatre Square is also located the Pleciuga Puppet Theatre. Additionally, the Sky Garden skyscraper at 24 Niedziałkowskiego Street houses the headquarters of the TVP3 Szczecin.

== Religion ==
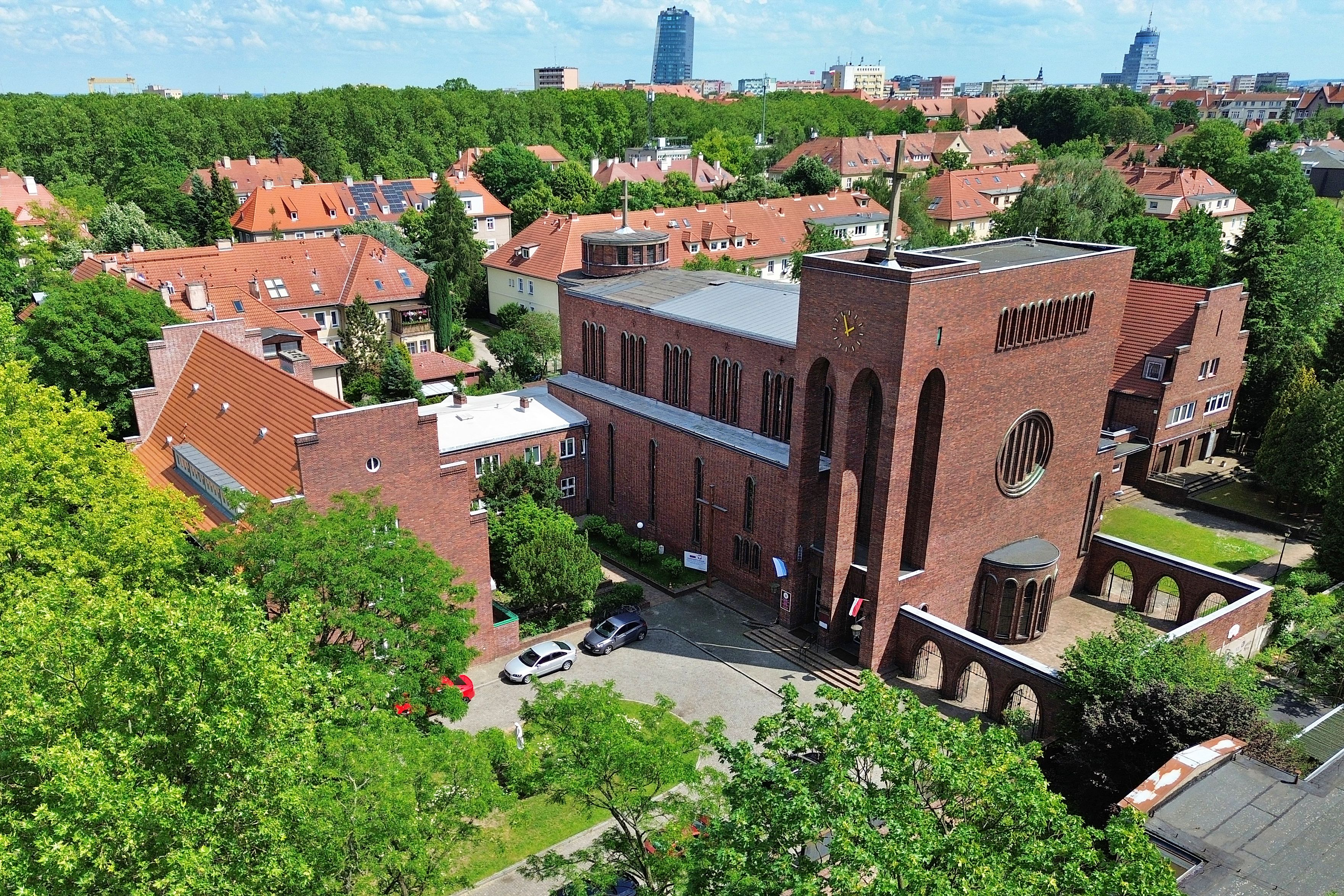
The Holy Family Church.

The neighbourhood includes two churches of the Catholic denomination. This includes the Holy Family Church at 28 Królowej Korony Polskiej, and the St. Dominic Church at 1 Victims of Katyn Square. The latter includes the monastery of the Dominican Order. At 49 Bolesława Śmiałego Street is also present the Kingdom Hall of Jehovah's Witnesses.

== Health care ==
Within the neighbourhood at 9, 10, and 11 Piotra Skargi Street is located the 109th Military Hospital.

== Boundaries ==
Its boundaries are approximately determined by Skargi Street, around the 109 Military Hospital, Giedroyć Rouandabout, Staszica Street, Plater Street, Gontyny Street, Matejki Street, Malczewskiego Street, Wielkopolska Street, Grey Ranks Square, Piątego Lipca Street, Bolesława Śmiałego Street, Mickiewicza Street, and Wawrzyniaka Street. It borders Niebuszewo-Bolinko, Centrum, Drzetowo-Grabowo, Śródmieście-Zachód, Turzyn, and Łękno. Śródmieście-Północ has a total area of 1.41 km^{2}.
