= Jan Kasprowicz Park =

Park in Szczecin, Poland

- Park im. Jana Kasprowicza
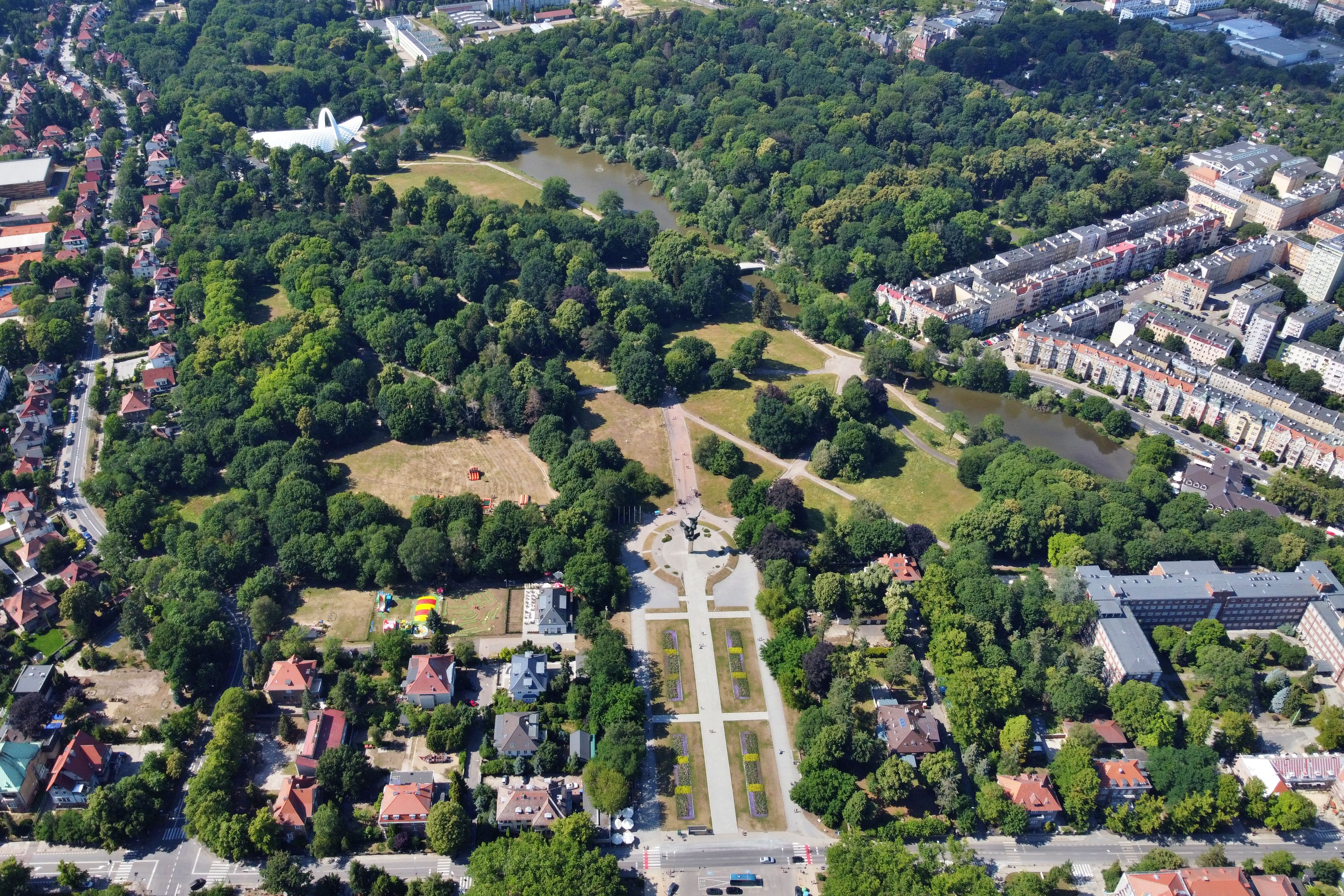
- The Kasprowicz Park in 2022. The picture include the Monument to Polish Endeavor, the Summer Theater, and the Rusałka lake.
- Interactive map of Jan Kasprowicz Park
- Type: Urban park
- Location: Szczecin, Poland
- Coordinates: 53°26′42″N 14°31′57″E
- Area: circa 66.8 acres (0.270 km^{2}; 0.1044 mi^{2})
- Created: 1900

The Jan Kasprowicz Park, (Note: Polish: Park im. Jana Kasprowicza) also known as the Kasprowicz Park, (Note: Polish: Park Kasprowicza) and until 1945 known as Quistorp Park, is the biggest urban park in Szczecin, Poland located within municipal neighbourhood of Łękno near the boundaries of Śródmieście–Północ and Niebuszewo–Bolinko. The area of the park is circa 27.03 ha. Together with Arkona Forest Park it forms Kasprowicz–Arkona Park Complex which area is 91,69 ha. It borders the Jasne Błonia on the south east and the Stefan Kownas Arboretum on the north.

== Characteristics ==
The park borders are formed by J. Słowacki Street, B. Zaleski Street, S. Wyspiański Street and P. Skarga Street. It is located on the slops of Niemierzyńska Valley next to Rusałka lake and makes the boundary fragment of Ueckermünde Heath.

== History ==
Archeological excavation in the area of Kochanowski and Curie–Skłodowska Streets has shown evidence of Jastorf culture settlement from the 3rd century BC to the 1st century AD.

The park was established in the city of Stettin in 1900 and named Quistorp Park after Johannes Quistorp, who gave the city the neighbouring areas of Jasne Błonia square (at the time known as Quistorp-Aue) and Arkona Woods (at the time known as Eckerberger Wald).

In 1945, after the end of World War II, accompanying transfer of the city to Polish People's Republic and deportation of previous city population, park was renamed into Jan Kasprowicz Park (Polish: Park im. Jana Kasprowicza), after the poet Jan Kasprowicz.

In 1994 the Firery Birds sculpture by Władysław Hasior was installed. The following year the Summer Theater amphitheatre and neighbouring stone sculptures were built next to it. The amphitheater is capable of hosting 4 500 people.

On 3 September 1977 the Monument to Polish Endeavor by Kazimierz Gustaw Zemła was finished.

On 20 April 2007 the Różanka Rose Garden was rebuilt.

On 9 December 2016 the Monument of Hungarian Boy by Richárd Juha was placed in the park, commemorating the support the population of Szczecin provided to the people of Budapest during the Hungarian Revolution of 1956.

== Gallery ==
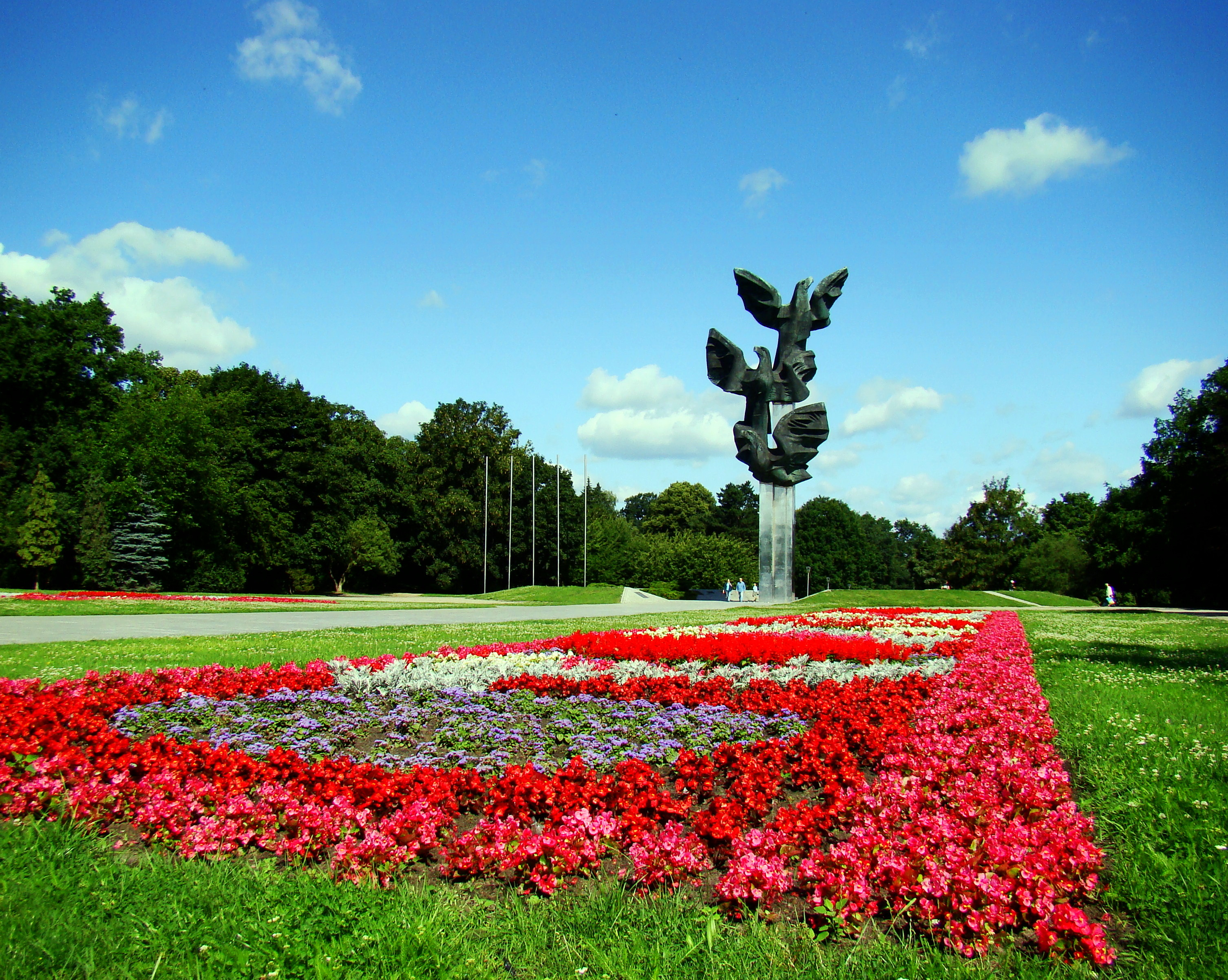
Monument to Polish Endeavor by Kazimierz Gustaw Zemła

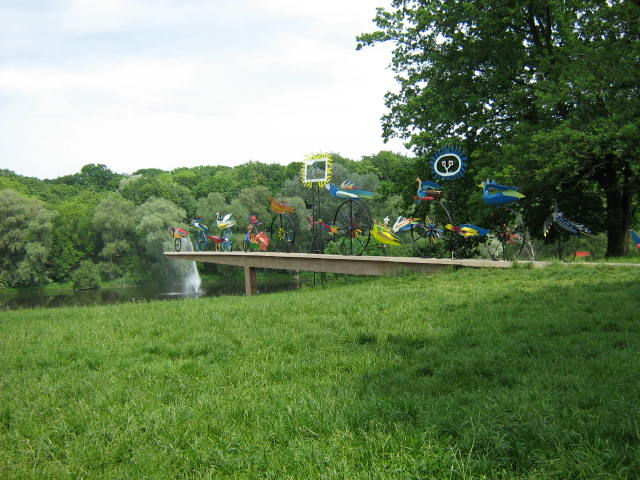
Firery Birds sculpture by Władysław Hasior

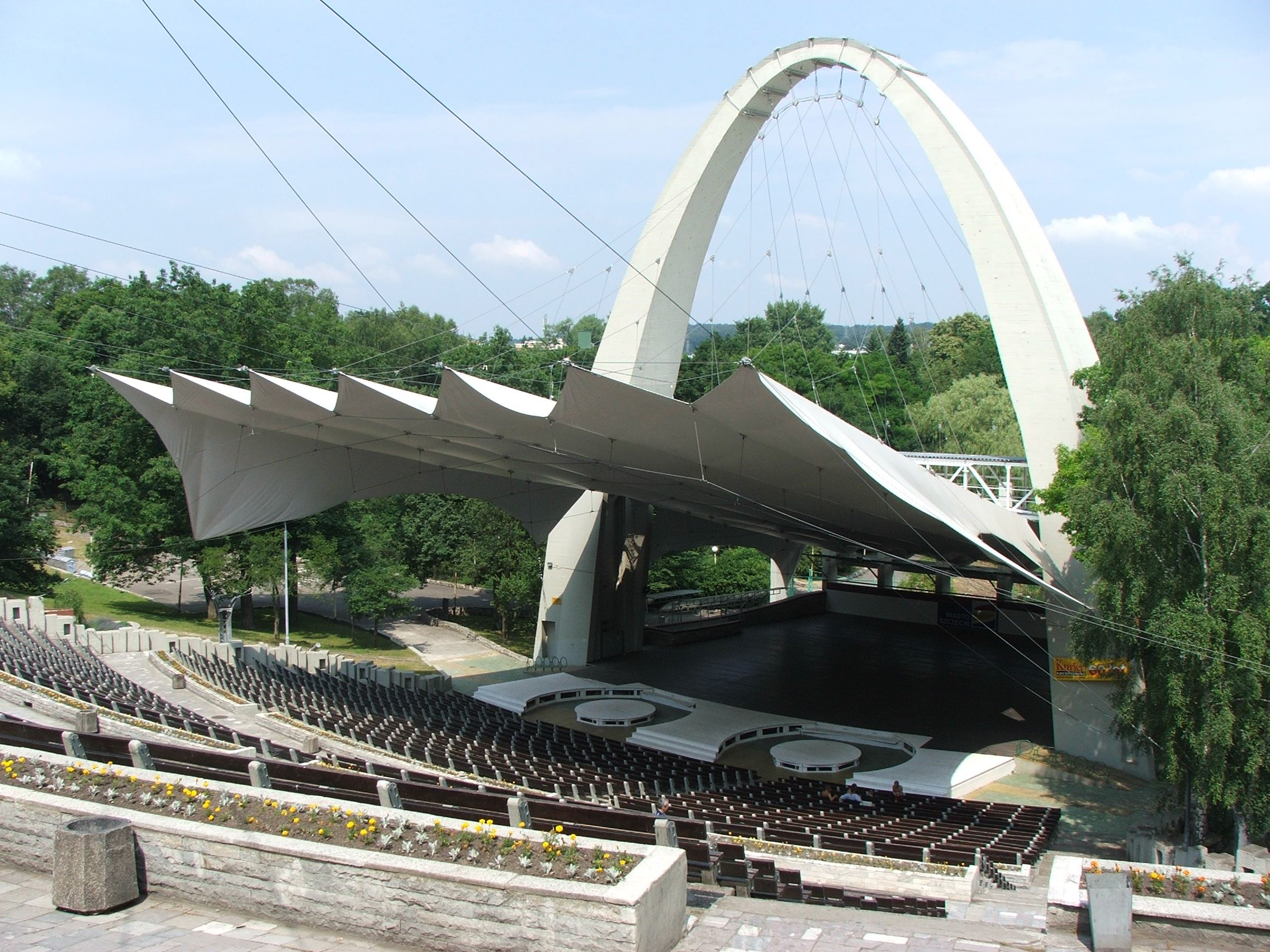
Summer Theater.

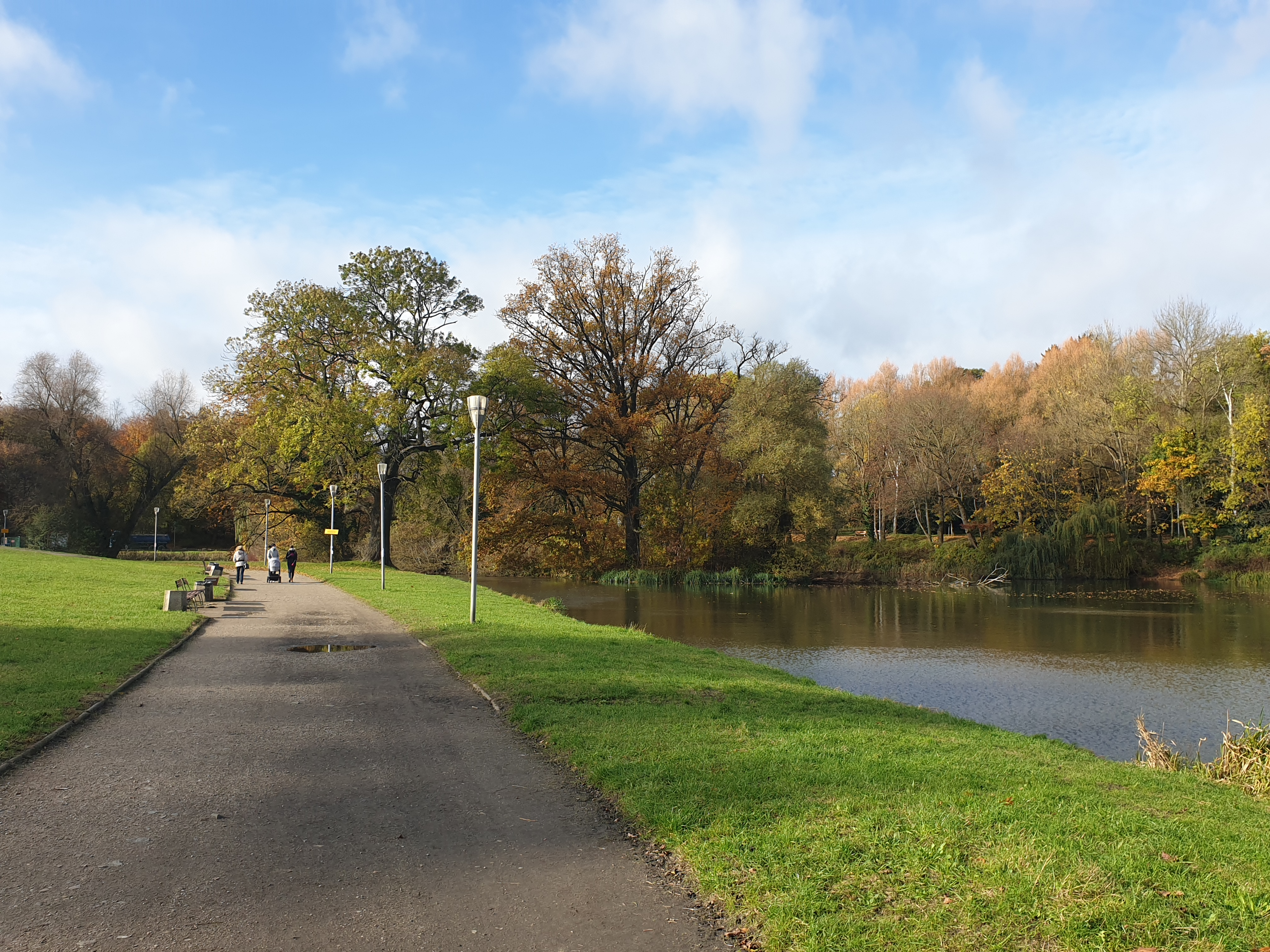
Rusałka lake.

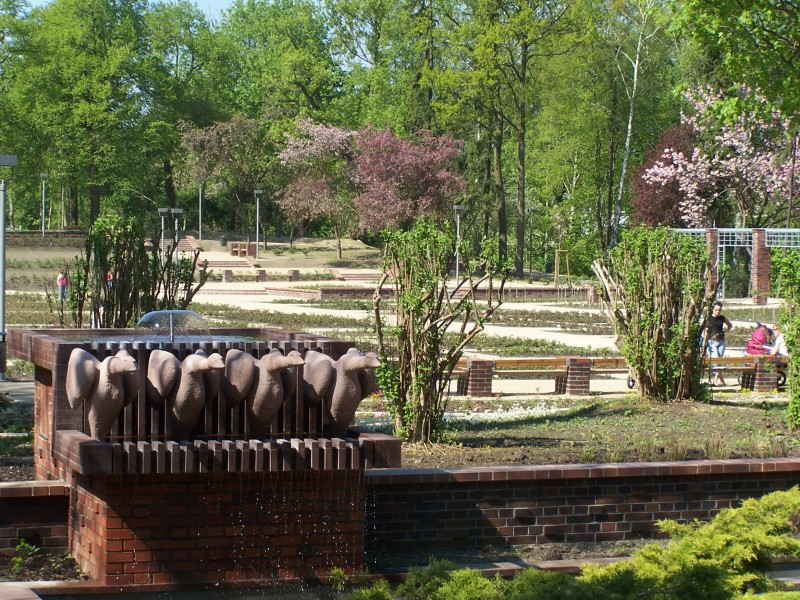
Różanka Rose Garden.
