= The Bird Fountain =

1935 modernist fountain sculpture by

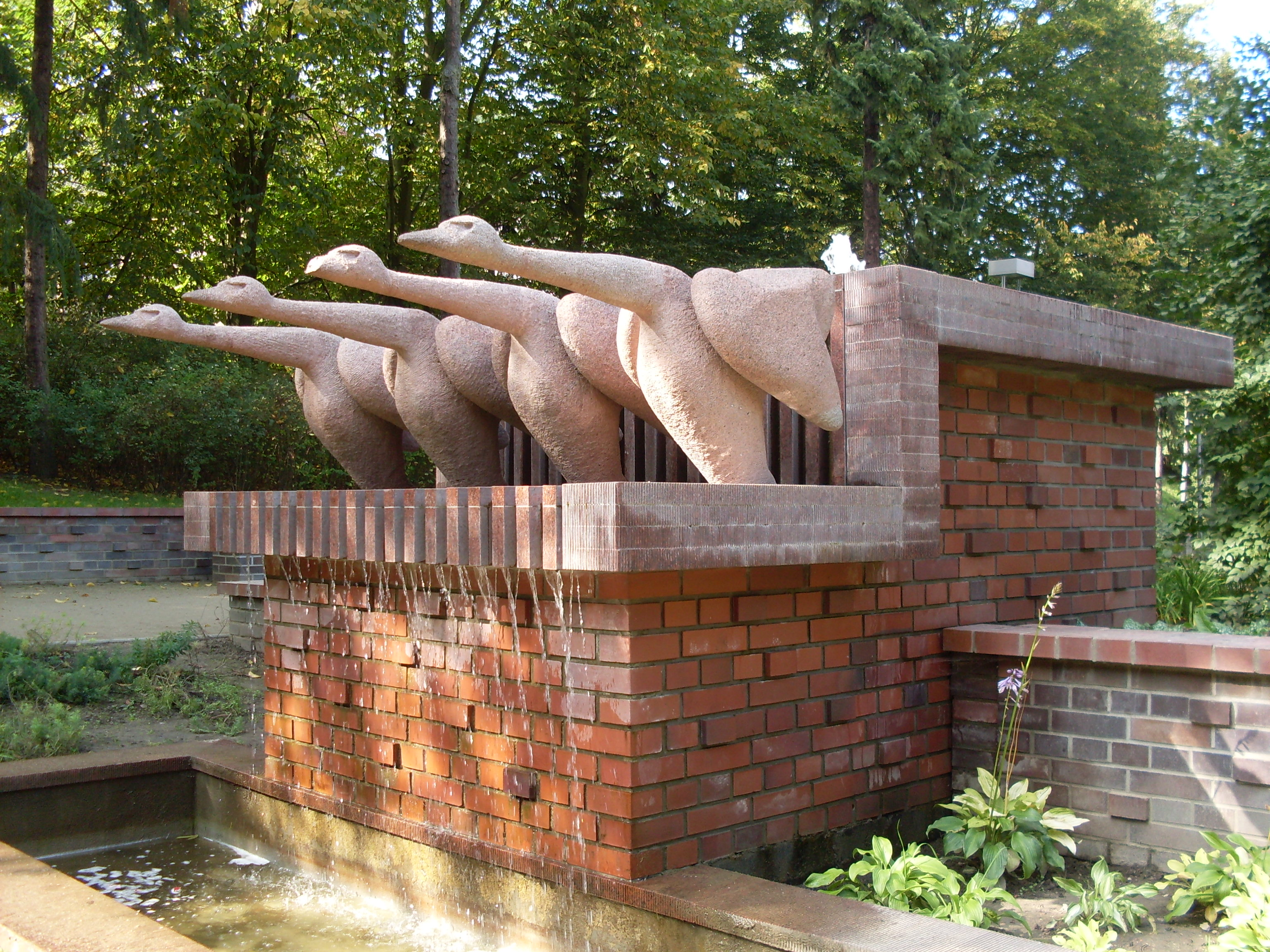
- The sculpture in 2008.
- Artist: Kurt Schwerdtfeger
- Completion date: 1935
- Medium: Concrete (sculpture); clinker brick, granite (fountain pedestal)
- Dimensions: 160 cm × 230 cm (63 in × 91 in)
- Condition: Standing, renovated
- Location: Szczecin, West Pomeranian Voivodeship, Poland; 53°26′47.15″N 14°31′31.34″E

The Bird Fountain (German: Vogelbrunnen; Polish: Ptasia Fontanna), also known as The Bird Well (Polish: Ptasia Studnia), is a 1935 modernist sculpture by Kurt Schwerdtfeger, displayed in the city of Szczecin in West Pomeranian Voivodeship, Poland. It forms a fountain, consisting of four concrete sculptures of geese placed on top of a pedestal made from clinker bricks and red granite. It was unveiled in 1935 at the Różanka Rose Garden. After the Second World War, the sculpture was heavily damaged with one of the four sculptures being destroyed. In the 1980s, it was removed from the park, being moved to the Voivodeship Conservator of Monuments in Szczecin on 14A Kuśnierska Street. It was restored in 2006 by conservator Małgorzata Haas-Nogal, and placed at its original location in 2007.

== History ==
In 1935, the modernist sculpture by Kurt Schwerdtfeger was unveiled in the Różanka Rose Garden. It took a form of a fountain consisting of four concrete sculptures of geese, placed on top of a pedestal made from clinker bricks and red granite. After the Second World War, the rose garden deteriorated due to lack of founding for its preservation, including The Bird Fountain, which was heavily damaged with one of the four sculptures being destroyed. In the 1980s it was given to the Archdiocesan Theological Higher Seminary of Szczecin. The remaining three bird statues of The Bird Fountain were removed and moved to the headquarters of the Voivodeship Conservator of Monuments in Szczecin on 14A Kuśnierska Street. The garden was re-acquired by the city in 2005, and following the renovations, it was reopened on 15 May 2007. The fountain sculpture have been restored by conservator Małgorzata Haas-Nogal in 2006, including the recreation of one of the bird statues which have been previously destroyed, and was placed at its original location in 2007.

== Characteristics ==
The sculpture takes a form of a fountain placed in the Różanka Rose Garden. It consists of four modernist sculptures of geese with their heads and necks reached straight forward. They are placed on a pedestal made from clinker bricks and red granite, with a fountain basin at the bottom. Each sculpture of a bird has a height of 64 cm (25.2 in). The monument in total measures 160 cm (62.99 in) in height and 230 cm (9.55 in) in width.
