= Theatre Square =

Theatre Square may refer to:

- Theatre Square, Tskhinvali, South Ossetia, Georgia
- Theatre Square, Lima, Peru
- Theatre Square, Bydgoszcz, Poland
- Theatre Square (Warsaw), Poland
- Theatre Square (Szczecin), Poland
- Theatre Square (Moscow), Russia
- Theatre Square (Saint Petersburg), Russia
- Theatre Square (Rostov-on-Don), Russia

== See also ==
- Theatre in the Square, a professional theatre in Cobb County, Georgia, U.S.
- TheatreSquared, a professional theatre in Fayetteville, Arkansas, U.S.
- Theaterplatz (disambiguation), in German
