= Sky garden =

Sky garden may refer to:

- 20 Fenchurch Street sky garden, an indoor garden atop a skyscraper in the City of London financial district
- Meguro Sky Garden, a roof garden park in Tokyo
- Seoul Skygarden, an elevated, linear park in Seoul
- Sky Gardens, a tower in Dubai
- Sky Gardens Nine Elms, a residential building in Central London
- Water Sky Garden, a sculptural environment designed by Janet Echelman for the 2010 Vancouver Olympics
- Sky Garden, Szczecin, a building in Szczecin
- Kai Tak Sky Garden, an elevated garden that is part of the Kai Tak Development
- Sky Garden, an observation deck atop Yokohama Landmark Tower

== See also ==
- Roof garden, a garden on the roof of a building
