= Hanza Tower =

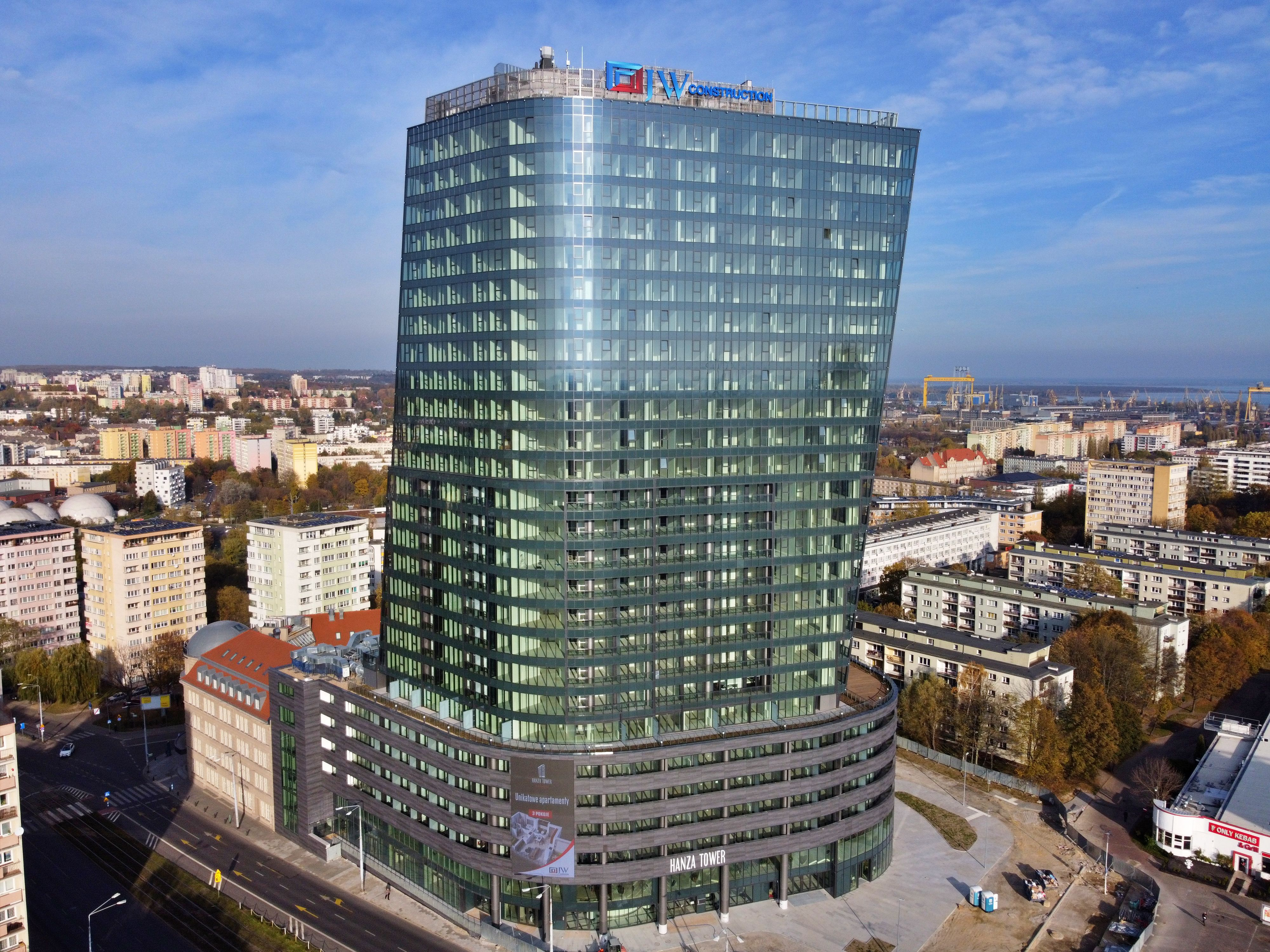
- Hanza Tower in 2021.

- Location within Poland

General information
- Type: Skyscraper
- Location: Śródmieście-Północ, Śródmieście, 50 Wyzwolenia Avenue, Szczecin, Poland
- Coordinates: 53°26′16″N 14°33′13″E
- Construction started: September 2011
- Completed: March 2021

Height
- Height: 125 m

Technical details
- Floor count: 34

Design and construction
- Architecture firm: Laguarda Low Architects LLC; Urbicon
- Main contractor: J.W. Construction; Calbud

Other information
- Parking: 383

Website
- http://www.hanzatower.pl/en/

Hanza Tower is a skyscraper in Szczecin, Poland, located at the 50 Wyzwolenia Avenue, in the Śródmieście-Północ municipal neighbourhood. The building is 125 m tall, making it the tallest building in the city. It has 34 floors, including 4 underground. Its construction begun in 2011, and had been finished in 2021. The building had been designed in the shape of the ship sail, with the project made by companies Laguarda Low and Urbicon.

== Description ==
The skyscraper is located in the city of Szczecin, Poland, at the 50 Wyzwolenia Avenue, in the Śródmieście-Północ municipal neighbourhood. It was designed in the traditional and high-tech style, and shaped to look like a sail of a ship.

It is 125 metres (410 ft) tall, making it the tallest building in the city. Its height from the base to the roof is 100 metres (330 ft). It has 34 floors, including 4 underground, and its total usable area is 54,337 square metres (584,880 sq ft). Of that, 22,000 square metres (240,000 sq ft), is for the residential space located in the upper levels, while 17,891 square metres (192,580 sq ft), for the commercial and service space, located at the lower ones. The building has 480 residential apartments, whose area varies from 24 square metres (260 sq ft) to 220 square metres (2,400 sq ft). Its underground car park can house 383 vehicles.

== History ==
The construction of the building begun in September 2011. It was designed by the companies Laguarda Low, and Urbicon, and it was constructed by Calbud, and J.W. Construction. The name of the building comes from the Hanseatic League, which short name, Hansa, is known in Polish as Hanza. The cost of the investment was estimated to be between 150 and 200 million Polish złoty. The construction was planned to end in late 2020, however, following changes to the building's plans, it was moved to March 2021.

== Gallery ==
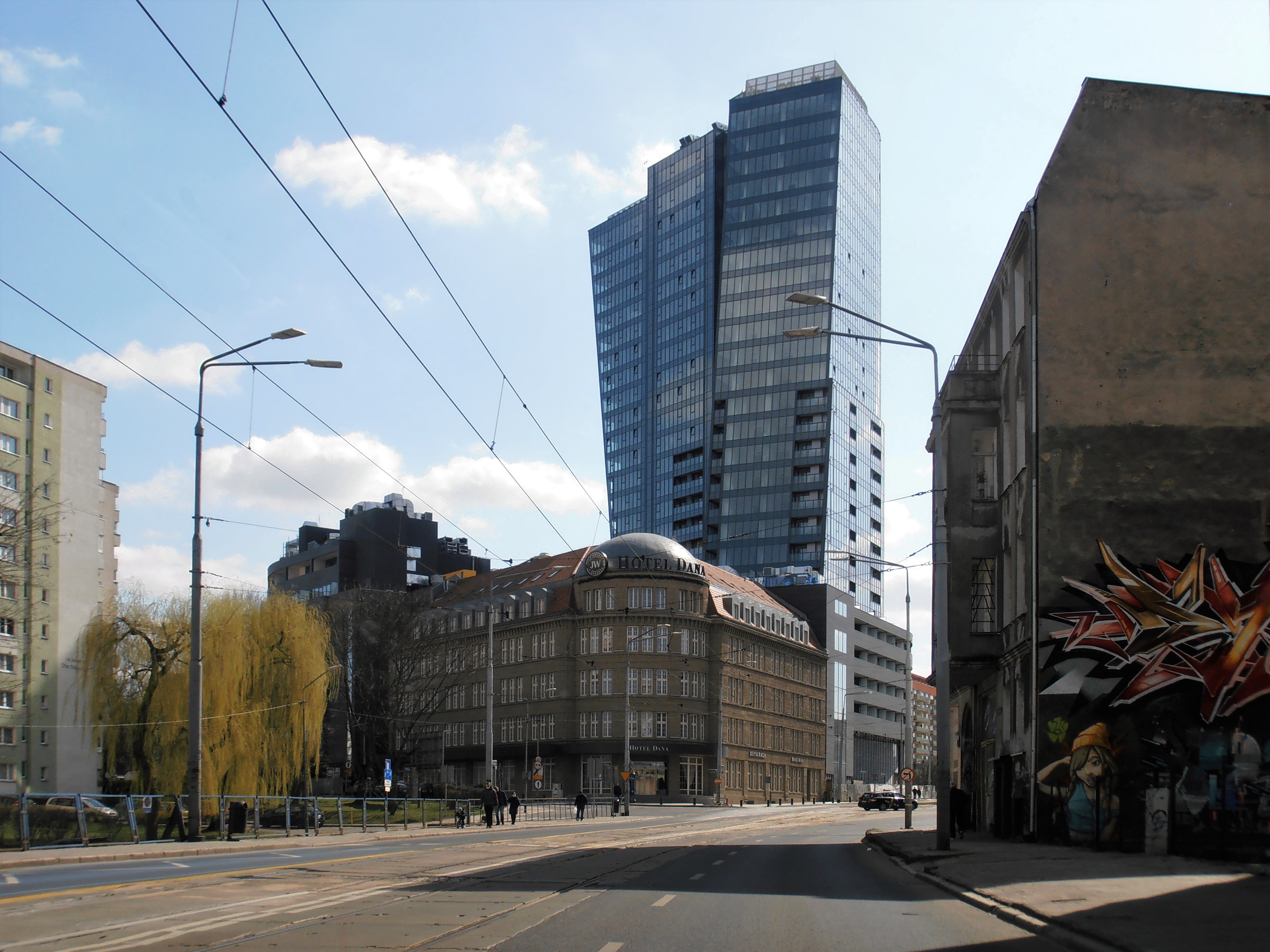
Hanza Tower in 2021, as seen from Wyzwolenia Avenue, and Ofiar Oświęcimia Street.

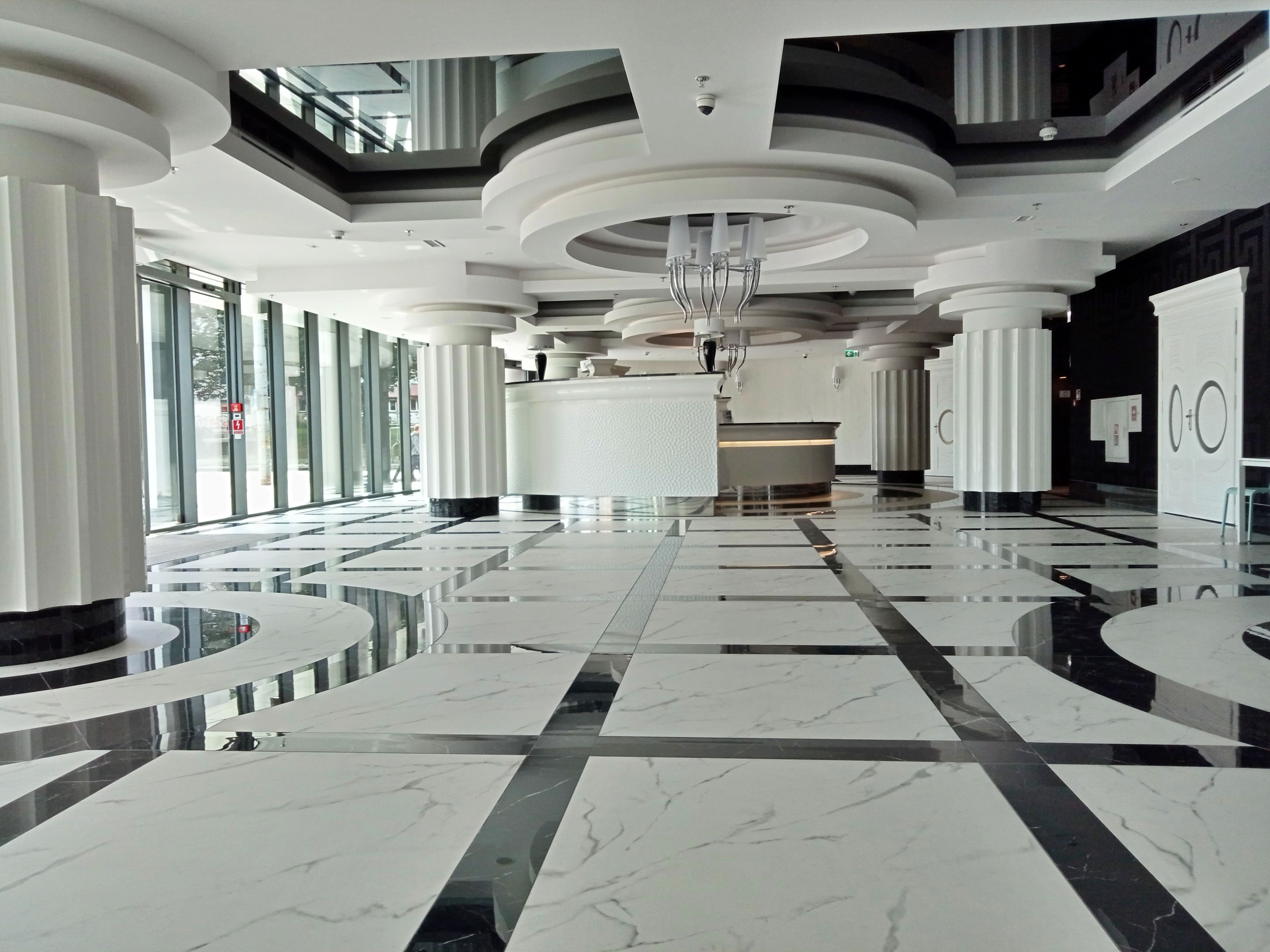
Main hall of the building in 2022.

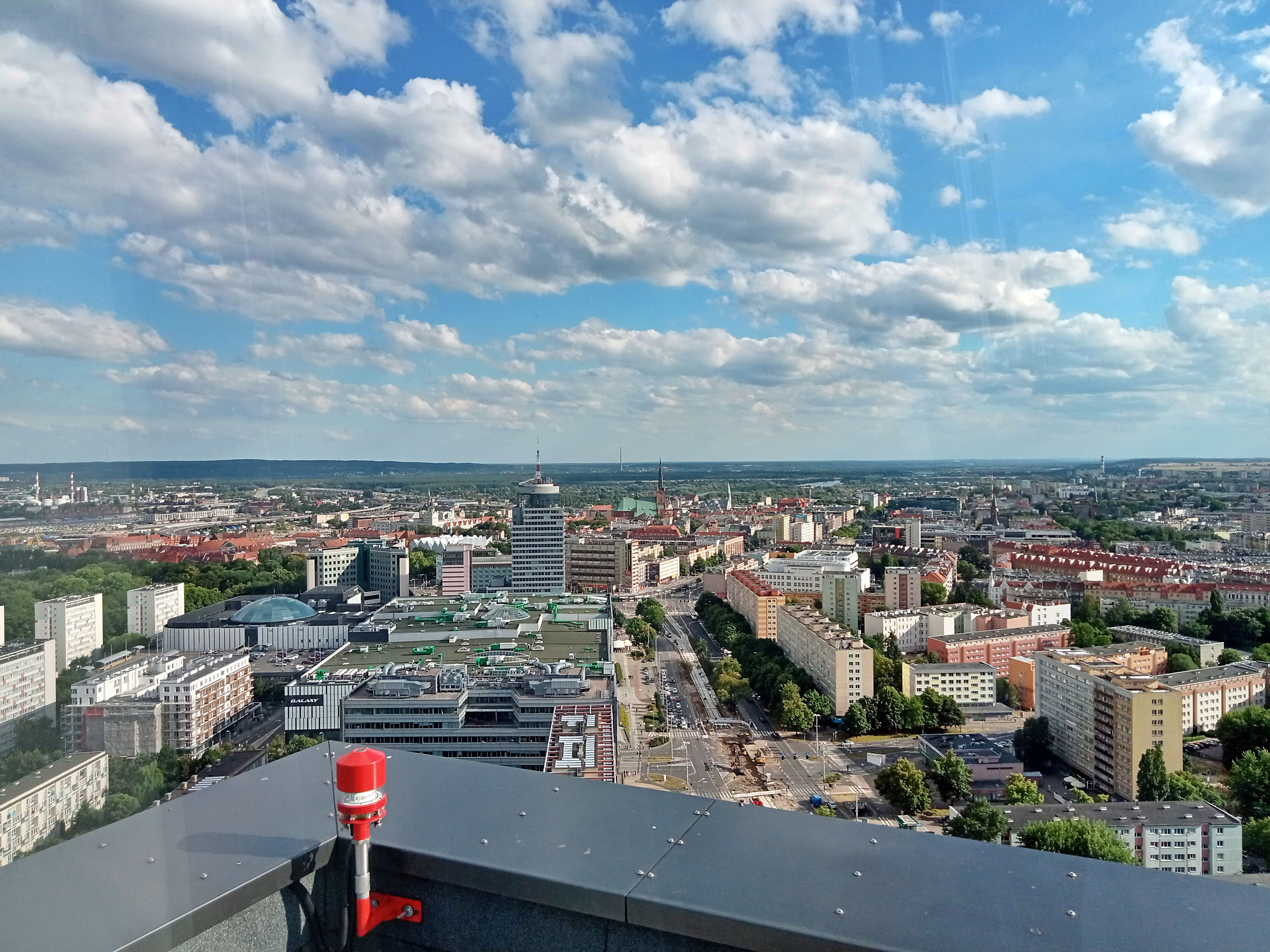
Panorama of Szczecin seen from Hanza Tower.

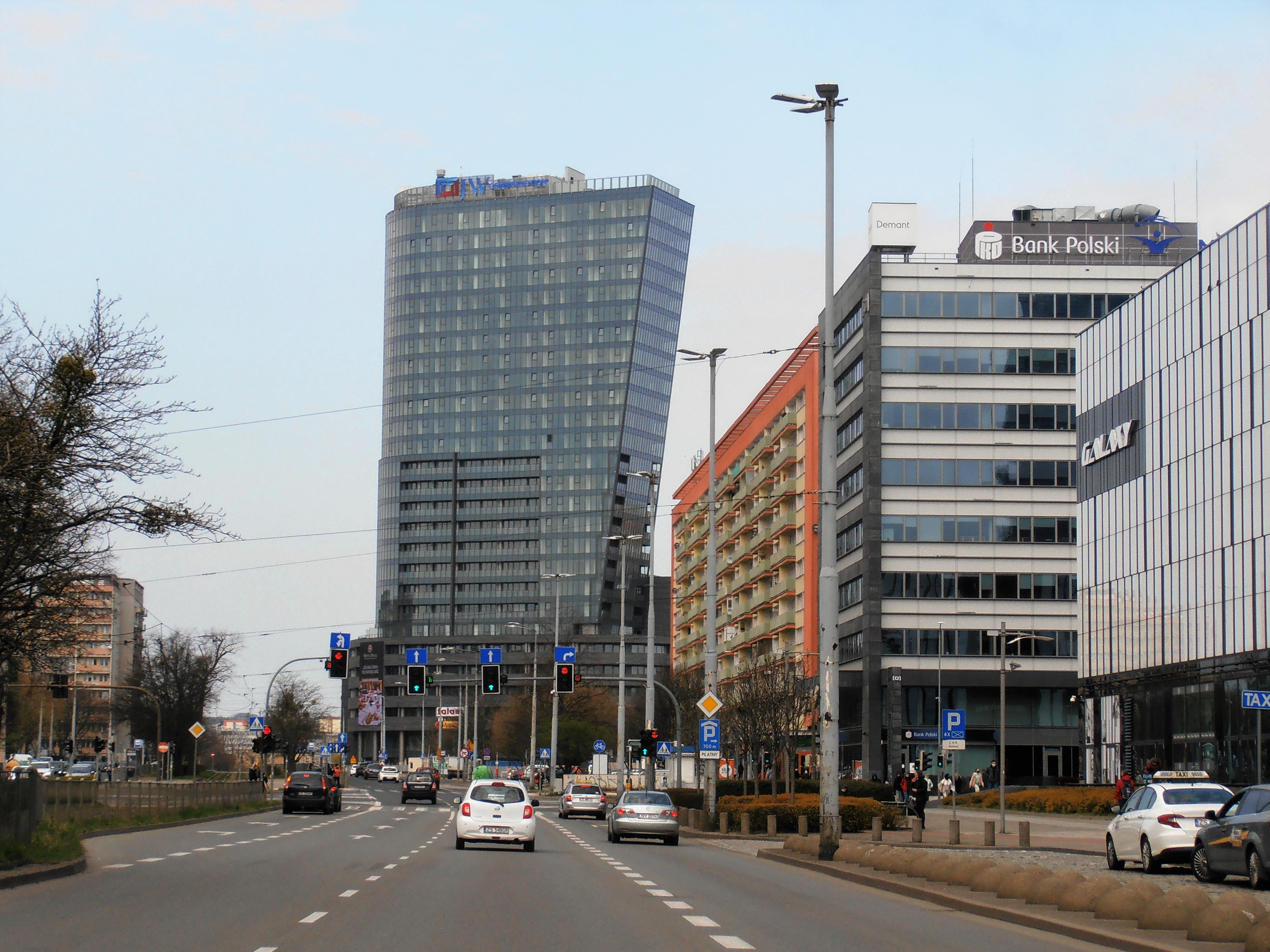
General view.
