= Oxygen (building) =

Shopping centre in Szczecin

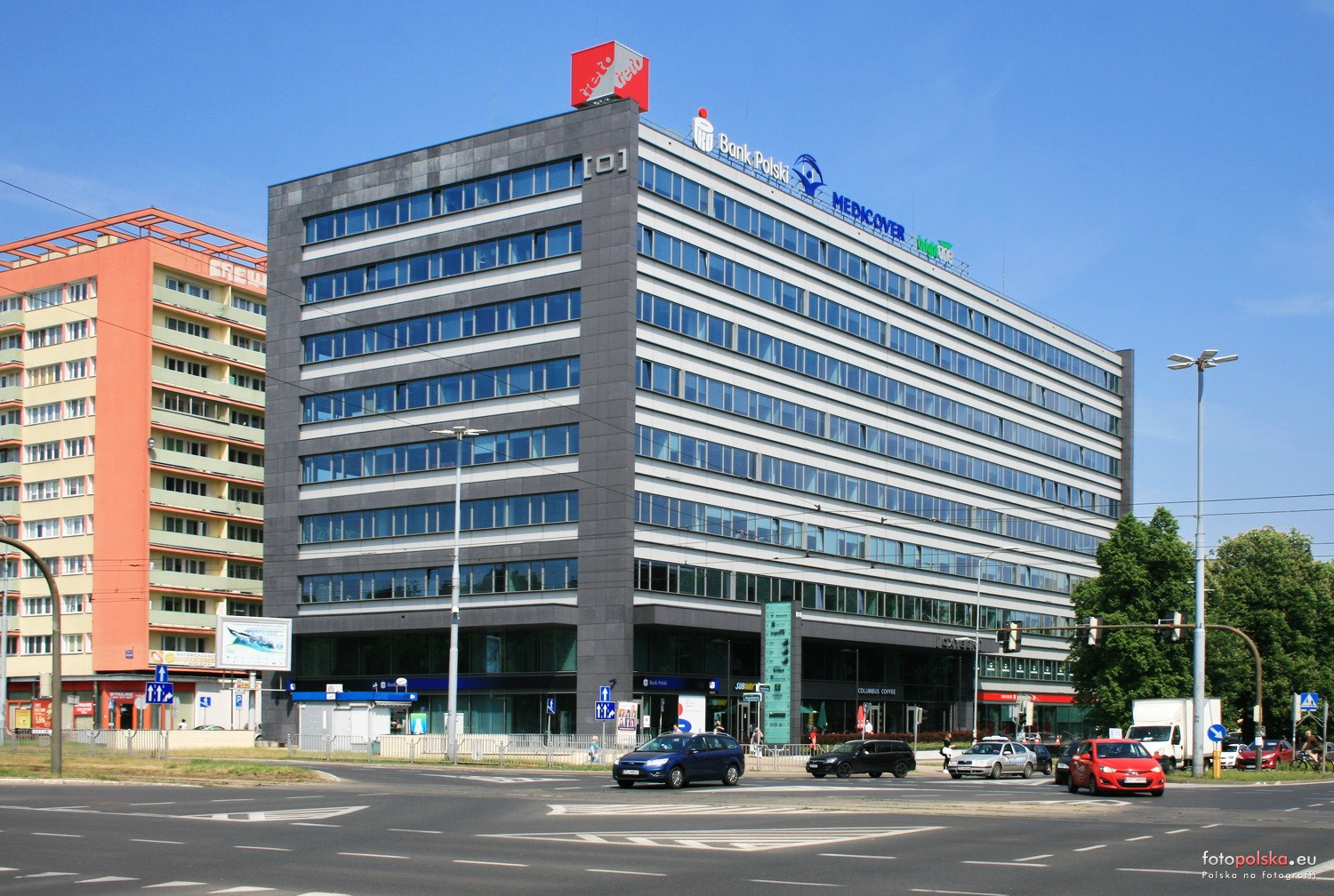
- The building in 2016.
- Interactive map of the Oxygen area

General information
- Type: Office building
- Location: 26 Malczewski Street, Szczecin, Poland
- Coordinates: 53°26′7.28″N 14°33′17.9″E
- Construction started: October 2008
- Completed: July 2010
- Opened: 7 November 2010
- Owner: EPP

Height
- Height: 32 m

Technical details
- Floor count: 9 (+ 1 underground)
- Floor area: 16.666 m

Design and construction
- Architects: Michał Afeltowicz; Michał Baryżewski; Michał Dolistowski; Paweł Kwiecień; Zbigniew Reszka
- Architecture firm: Arch-Deco
- Developer: Echo Investment

Oxygen is an office building in Szczecin, Poland, located at 26 Malczewski Street, at the corner with Emancipation Avenue, within the neighbourhood of Downtown-North. It has 9 storyes, and the height of 36 m. The building was designed by Gdańsk-based architecture firm Arch-Deco, and opened on 7 November 2010. It was developed by Echo Investment, and is owned by the company EPP.

== History ==
The Oxygen office building was developed by Echo Investment, and designed by Gdańsk-based architecture firm Arch-Deco, with the team of Michał Afeltowicz, Michał Baryżewski, Michał Dolistowski, Paweł Kwiecień, and Zbigniew Reszka. The investation cost around 100 million Polish zloties. The building was constructed between October 2008 and July 2010, and officially opened on 7 November 2010. It was acquired by the company EPP. In 2021, it was granted the BREEAM In-Use certification.

== Characteristics ==
The Oxygen office building has 9 storeys, with the total height of 36 m, and one underground level. It has the floor area of 16.666 m^{2}, of which 12,500 m^{2} is dedicated to the office space.
