= Theaterplatz =

The German word Theaterplatz (Theatre Square) may refer to:

- Willy-Brandt-Platz, a square in Frankfurt
- Richard-Wagner-Platz (Leipzig), a square in Leipzig
- Theaterplatz (Dresden), a square in Dresden
- A square in Weimar next to the Deutsches Nationaltheater und Staatskapelle Weimar

== See also ==
- Theatre Square (disambiguation), in English
