= Rusałka (Szczecin) =

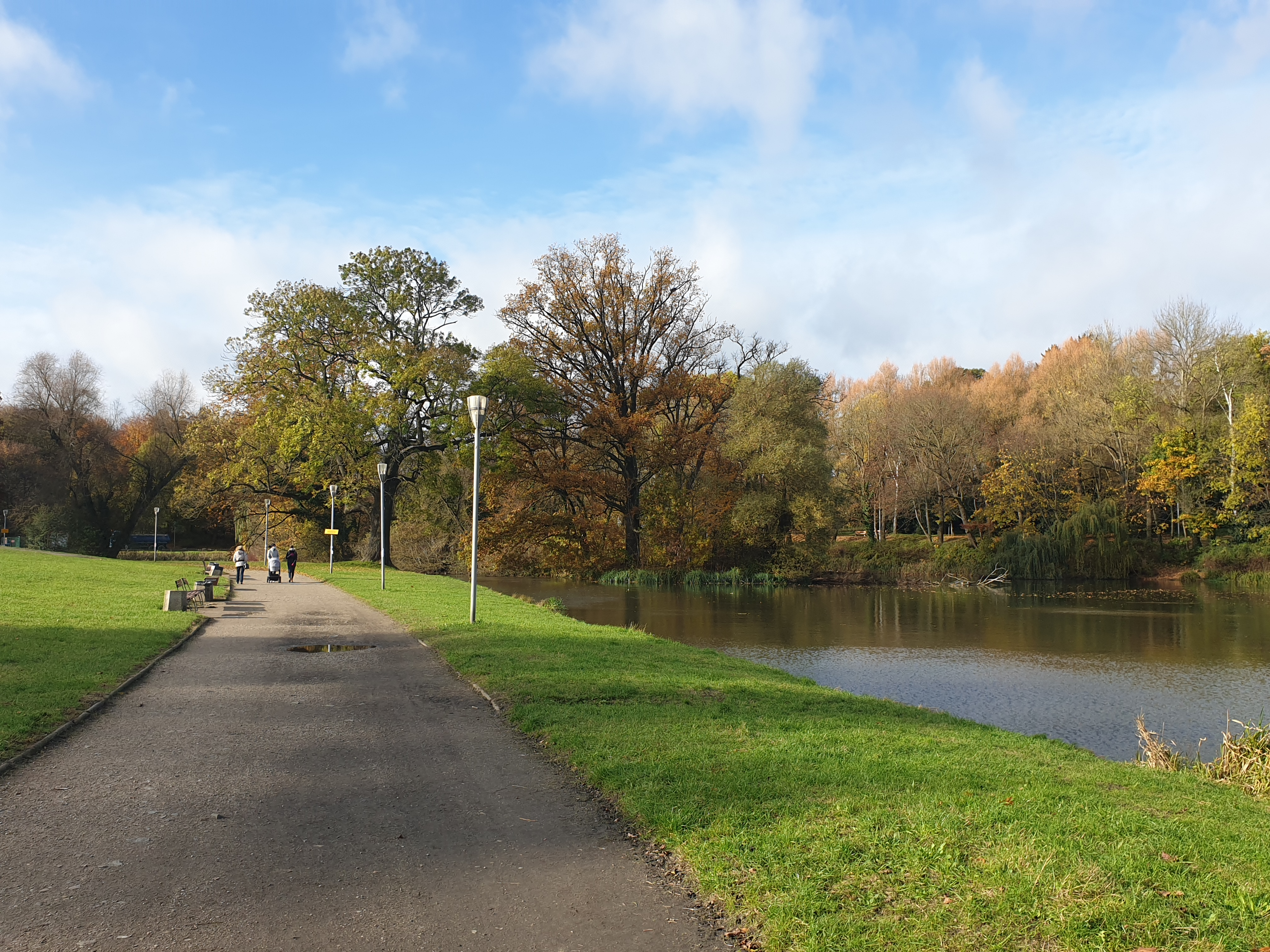
- West side of the Rusałka lake in 2020.

- Location within Poland
- Location: Szczecin, Poland
- Coordinates: 53°26′43″N 14°32′10″E
- Lake type: dam lake
- Primary inflows: Osówka
- Primary outflows: Osówka
- Basin countries: Poland
- Max. length: 0.67 km (0.42 mi)
- Max. width: 0.07 km (0.043 mi)
- Surface area: 0.03 km^{2} (0.012 sq mi)
- Surface elevation: 16 m (52 ft)
- Islands: Łabędzia Island
- Settlements: Szczecin, Poland

Rusałka (Polish: [ruˈsaw.ka]), until 1945 known as Westendsee (German: [ˌvɛstʔˈɛnt.zeː]; lit. 'West End Lake'), is a dam lake in Szczecin, Poland located in northern part of Jan Kasprowicz Park. It's only inflow and discharge is Osówka stream. Its area is 0.03 km^{2}, it is 0.67 km long and 0.07 km wide.

== History ==
Rusałka was formed druign the Middle Ages when the Osówka stream present in the area was dammed during the construction of nearby gristmills, one called Malzmühle the east and one, known as Lübsche Mühle, on the west side of the modern lake. The modern shape of the lake was formed in 1885 after the waters of Osówka were dammed again.

The inhabitants of Stettin (now Szczecin, Poland) could sail on the lake with rented boats and visit Haus am Westendsee coffeehouse, that operated at the prior site of the Malzmühle gristmill. In the beginning of 1960s building got demolished and its foundations were buried. In 2008 a local catering company bought the location, with the intention of building a new coffeehouse on the foundations of Haus am Westendsee however the plans were canceled and the location was sold in 2009.

In 1974–1976 the Summer Theatre was built next to the lake.

== Characteristics ==
Rusałka has a single island known as the Łabędzia Island (Polish: Łabędzia Wyspa, translation: swan island) located on the west side of it.

The lake has two bridges, one built in Japanese style located at the middle of the lake and the second one on its east side being an extension of Jan Żupański Street. Along its northern coast runs Julisz Słowacki Street. There is one fountain adjacent to the lake.

== Bibliography ==
- GUGiK: Nazewnictwo geograficzne Polski. Tom 1. Hydronimy. Część 2. Wykaz nazw wód stojących, page 299.
- Województwo zachodniopomorskie – atrakcyjne szlaki turystyczne. Mały przewodnik krajoznawczy by A. Adamczak, Szczecin, 2000/2002.
- Encyklopedia Szczecina by Tadeusz Białecki, Szczecin, 1999.
- Westendsee, Weinberg, Buchheide... Parki i zielone kawiarenki dawnego Szczecina by W. Łopuch, PUBLISHER'S, Szczecin, 2002.
- Zieleń Szczecina – ilustrowany przewodnik dendrologiczny by Aleksandra Stachak and others, Szczecin 2000.
