= Niemierzyn Valley =

Valley in Poland

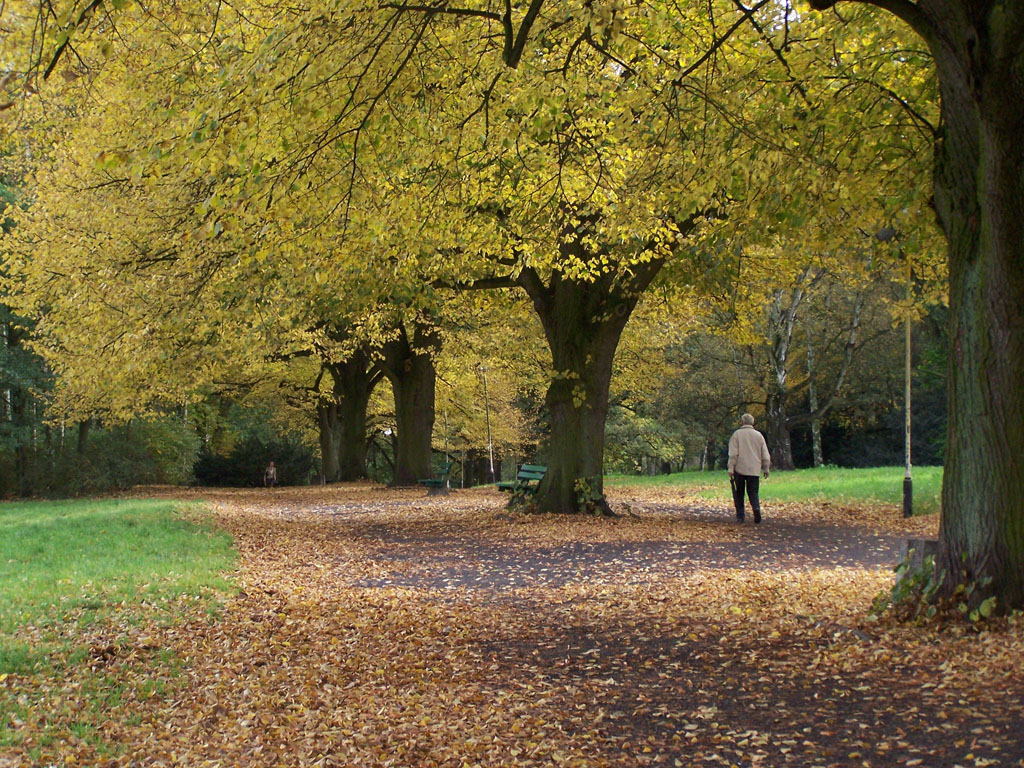
Jan Kasprowicz Park, located in the area of the valley.

Niemierzyn Valley (Polish: Dolina Niemierzyńska; German until 1945: Nemitzer Talgrund, Nemitzer Tal-Grund) is a valley in central western part of city of Szczecin, Poland.

== Characteristics ==
The valley is located next to Osówka stream. In the valley are located: Jan Kasprowicz Park, Stefan Kownas Arboretum and part of the Arkona Woods Park as well as the neighbourhood of Niemierzyn and part of Niebuszewo. Peat soils dominate the area.

== History ==
At the end of 16th century a sheep farm was probably located in the northern part of the valley, most probably being established by Eckelberg family.
