= Theatre Square (Szczecin) =

Urban square in Szczecin, Poland

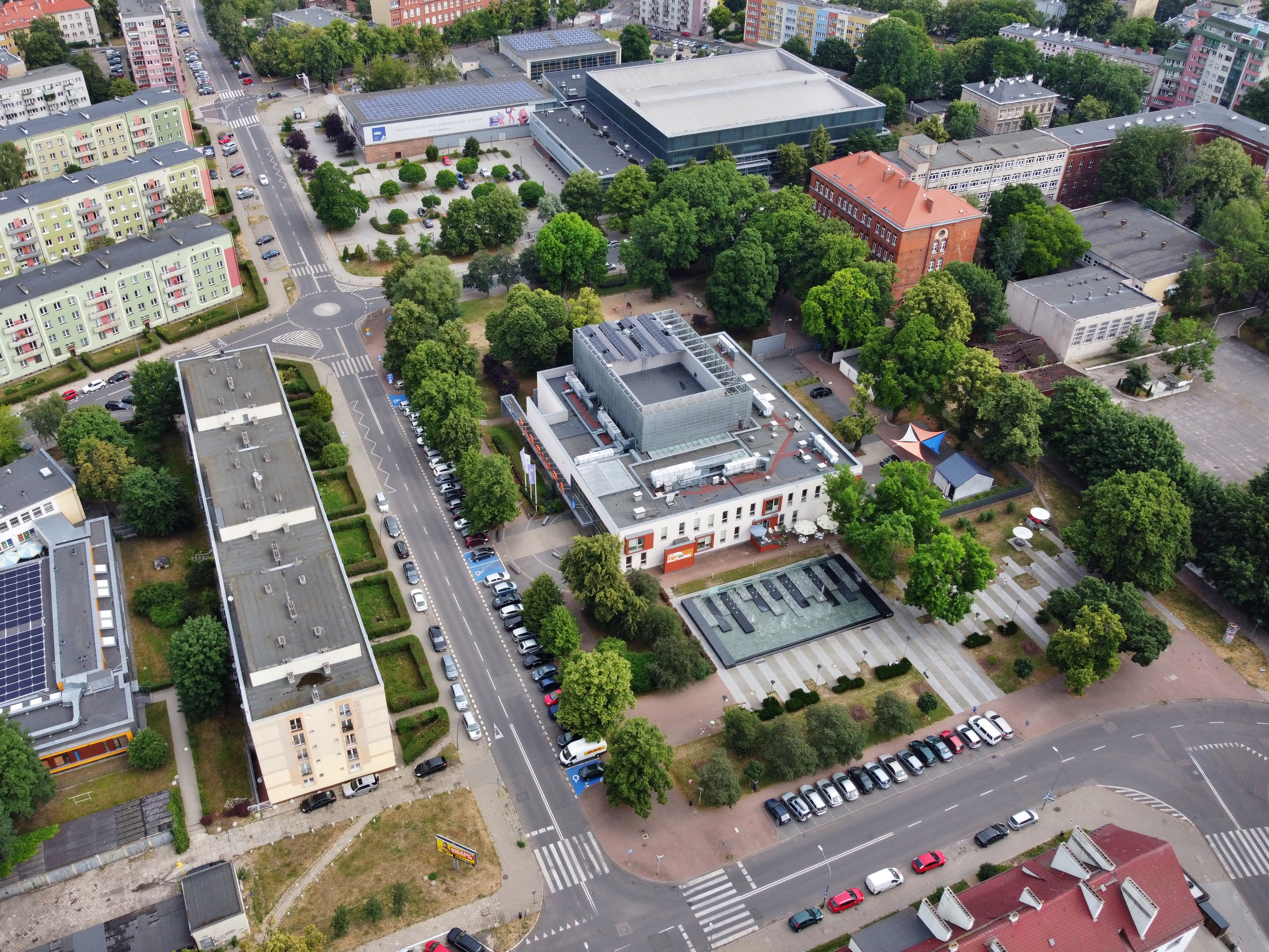
- The aerial view of the square in 2021.

- Location within Poland
- Type: Urban square
- Location: Downtown-North, Szczecin, Poland
- Coordinates: 53°26′13.7″N 14°32′51.8″E
- North: Niedziałkowskiego Street
- East: Niegolewskiego Street
- South: Wielkopolska Street
- West: Wąska Street

Construction
- Completion: 1900

The Theatre Square (Polish: Plac Teatralny; German: Theaterplatz) is an urban square in Szczecin, Poland, within the Downtown district. It is placed in the neighbourhood of Downtown-North, between Niedziałkowskiego, Niegolewskiego, Wielkopolska, and Wąska Streets. At its centre, it features the building of the Pleciuga Puppet Theatre. Next to the square is also placed the Szczecin House of Sports, an indoor multisport arena. The street layout of the square was drown in 1857. From the 1870s, it was a sports pitch, and in the year 1900, it was transformed into an urban square. In 2009, the building of the Pleciuga Puppet Theatre was constructed at its centre.

== Toponomy ==
The Theatre Square is named after Pleciuga Puppet Theatre, which building is placed at its centre. Originally, it was named the Blücher Square (German: Blücherplatz; Polish: Plac Blüchera) in the year 1900, after Gebhard Leberecht von Blücher (1742–1819), a field marshal general of the Prussian Army, who served during the Seven Years' War, the Pomeranian War, the French Revolutionary Wars, and the Napoleonic Wars. In 1945, it was renamed to the Georgy Zhukov Square (Polish: Plac Gieorgija Żukowa), in honour of Georgy Zhukov (1896–1974), a military leader who was the commander-in-chief of the Red Army of the Soviet Union during the Second World War. It was renmaed to its current name in 2008, following the petition from Pleciuga Puppet Theatre, and as part of the decommunisation process.

== History ==
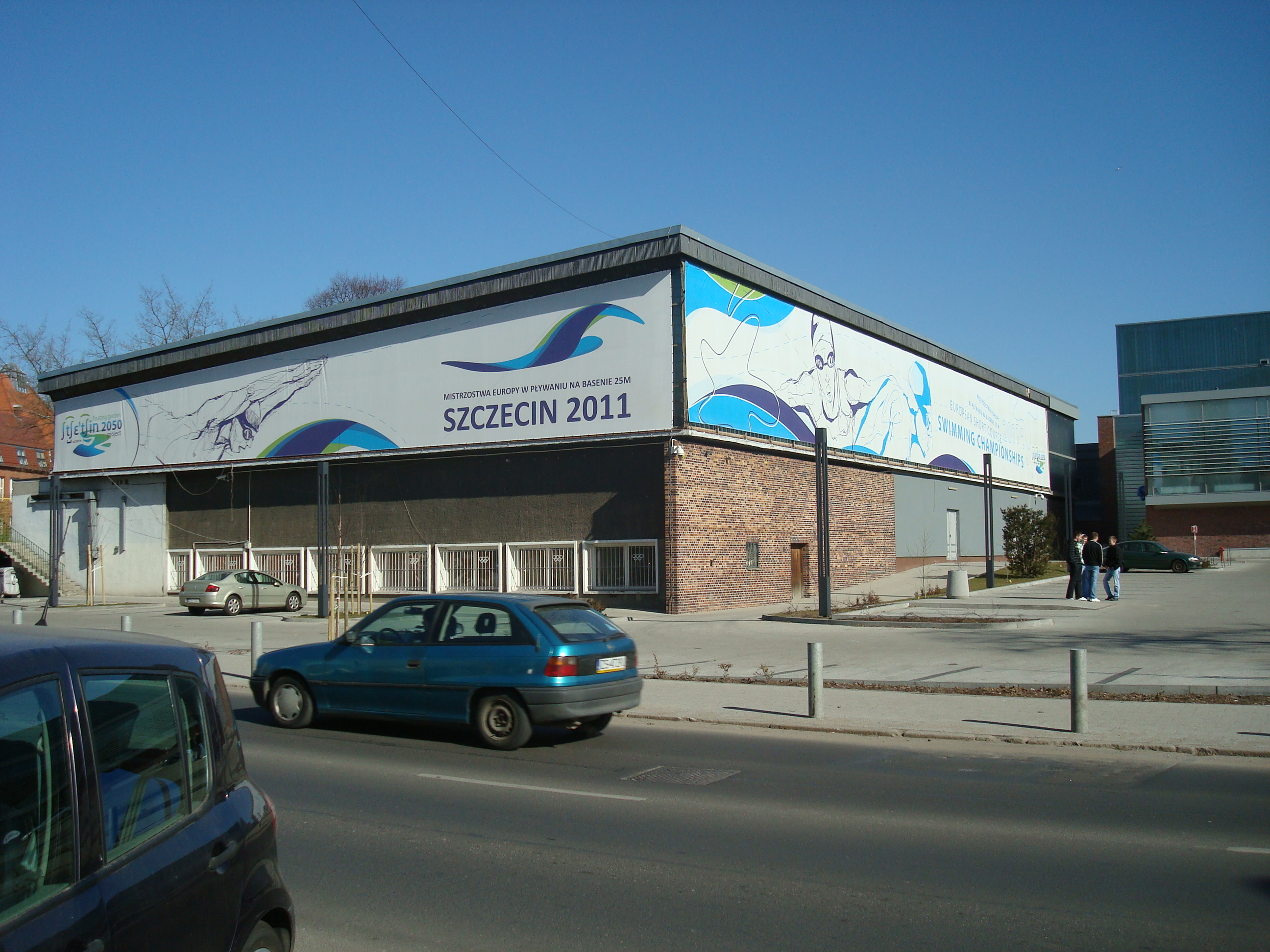
The Szczecin House of Sports, an indoor multisport arena, built next to the Theatre Square in the 1960s. The former building was demolished in 2023, and replaced with a new arena.

The street layout of the area was designed in 1857. From the 1870s, an area between modern Niedziałkowskiego, Niegolewskiego, Wielkopolska, and Wąska Streets was used as a sports pitch. In 1900, it was transformed into an urban square, with two parts with different ground elevations. It was named the Blücher Square, after Gebhard Leberecht von Blücher (1742–1819), a field marshal general of the Prussian Army, who served during the Seven Years' War, the Pomeranian War, the French Revolutionary Wars, and the Napoleonic Wars. In 1945, the square was renamed in honour of Georgy Zhukov (1896–1974), a military leader who was the commander-in-chief of the Red Army of the Soviet Union during the Second World War. At the time, it consisted of two parts, of which one was covered in trees, and one contained an association football pitch.

In the 1960s, the Voivodeship House of Sports, an indoor multisport arena, was built next to the square. In 2000, it was renamed to the Szczecin House of Sports, and in 2010, the Floating Area Olympic-size swimming pool was opened as part of the complex. The arena was demolished in 2023, with new building being opened in 2026.

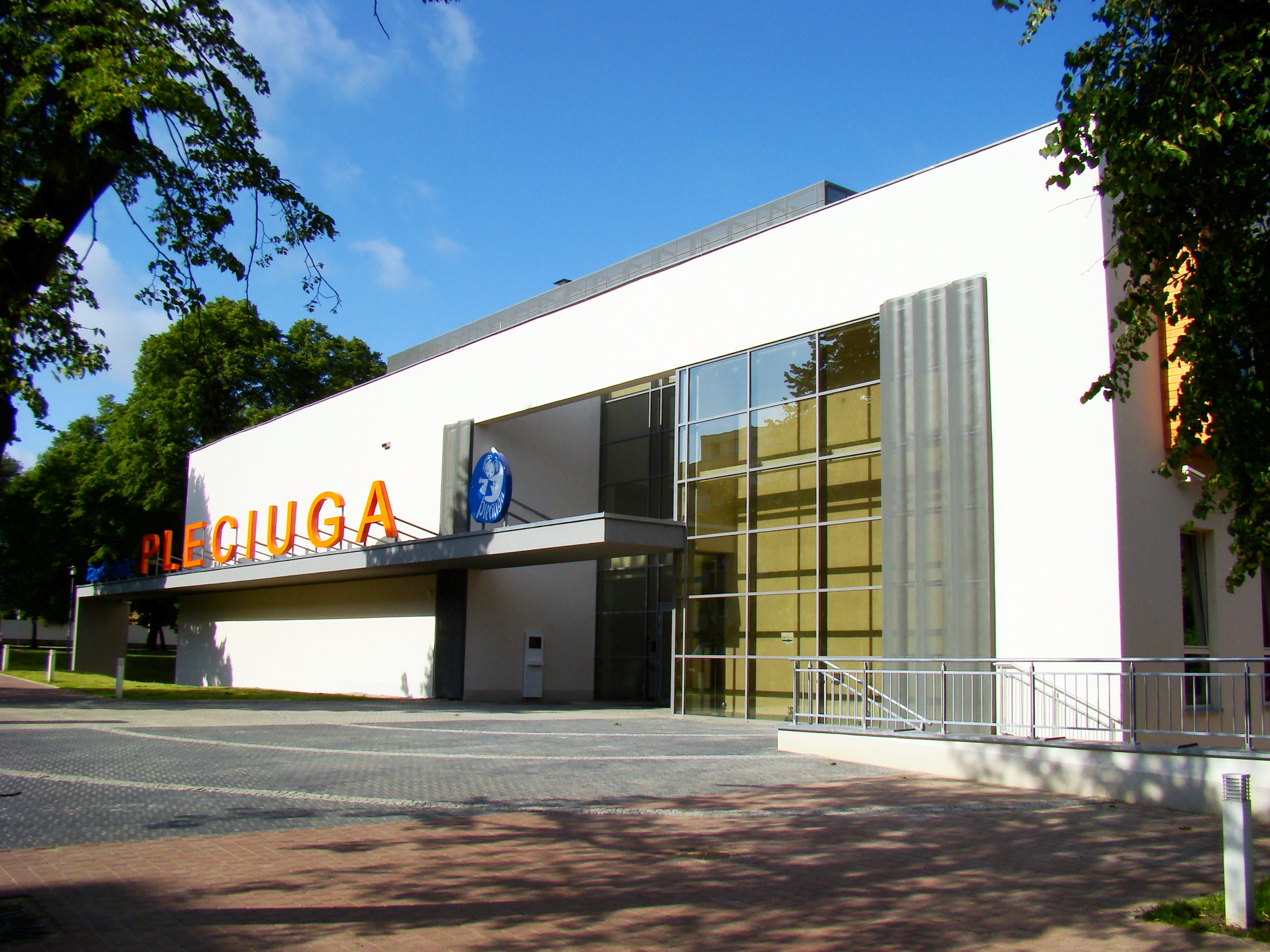
The Pleciuga Puppet Theatre, built at the centre of the square in 2009.

In 2007, the city council sold the square to Pleciuga Puppet Theatre, for 235.22 Polish zloties, a 0.01% of its market value estimated at 350,000 zloties. In 2008, following the petition from the owner, and as part of the decommunisation process, the area was renamed to the Theatre Square. Between 2008 and 2009, the new building of the Pleciuga Puppet Theatre was constructed in the centre of the square.
