= Różanka Rose Garden =

Polish botanical garden

Coordinates: 53°26′49″N 14°31′29″E

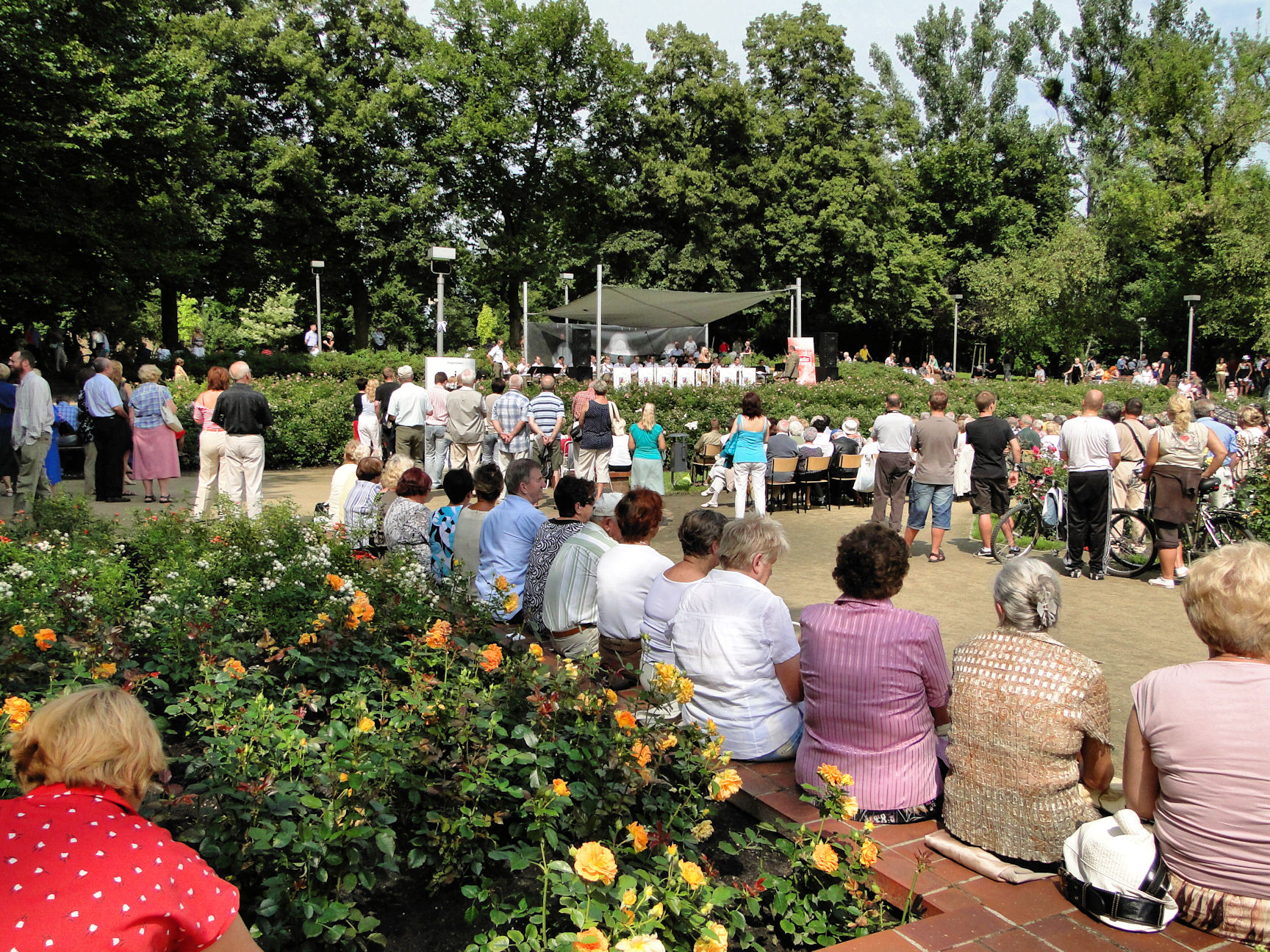
A concert in Różanka

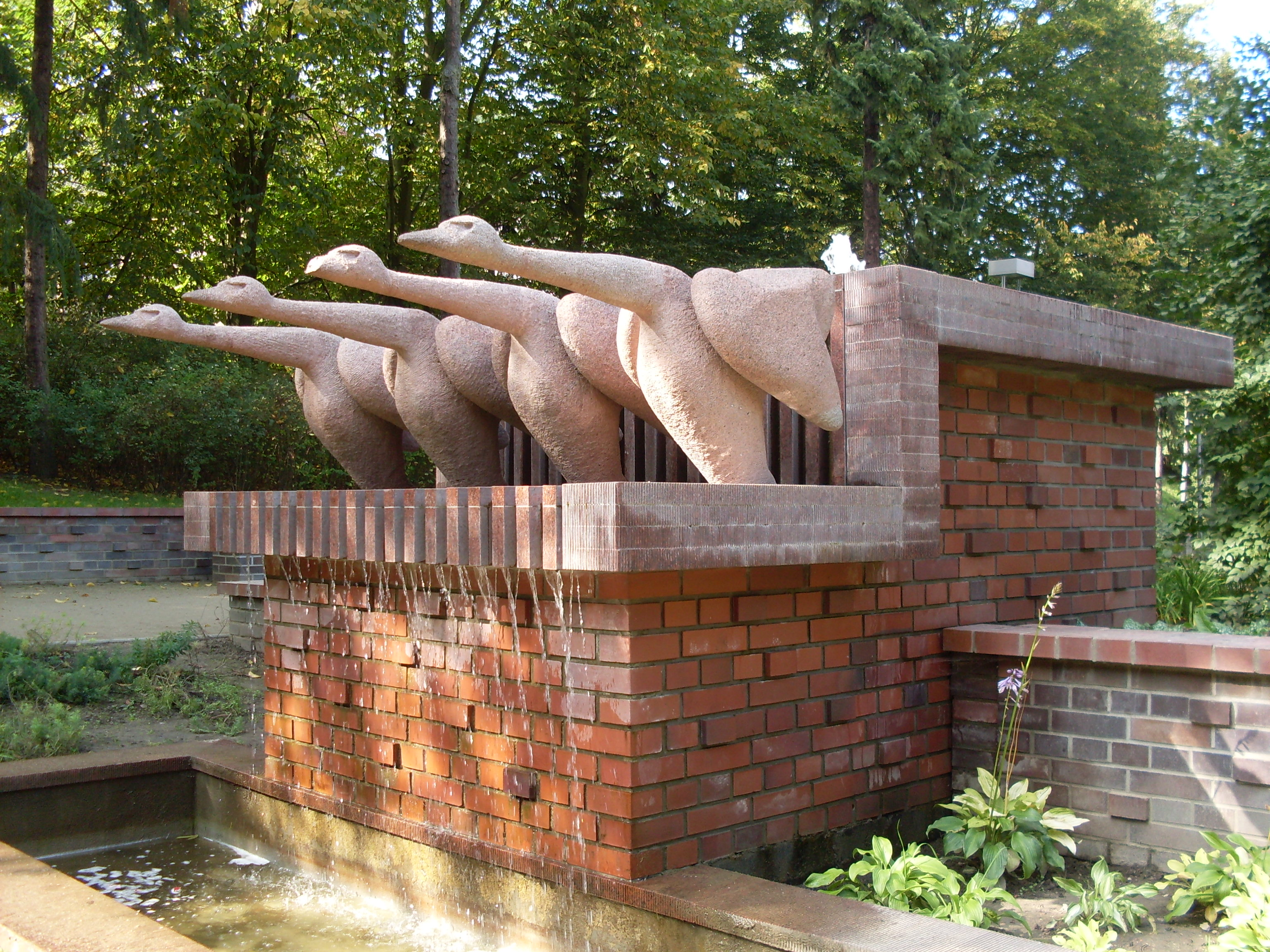
Sculpture of flying geese by Kurt Schwerdtfeger (1897-1966)

The Różanka Rose Garden (in German Staudengarten, Rosengarten), is a two-hectare botanical garden in the Łękno area of Szczecin, Poland.

The Różanka Rose garden was established in 1928 to commemorate the World Gardening Exhibition. In 1935, the Bird Well was built and it included 4 concrete sculptures of flying geese by Kurt Schwerdtfeger. The garden survived World War II and until the 1970s was a public recreational place. Due to lack of funding for its maintenance, the garden gradually began to deteriorate. In 1983, the garden was put under the care of the Roman Catholic Church. Since 2005, it has been maintained by the Szczecin City Council.

Between 2006 and 2007, the City Council reconstructed the garden to its appearance in the 1930s. The work was completed on 20 April 2007. Over nine thousand roses of 99 varieties were planted.

Apart from the flowers, the garden also contains exotic trees and shrubs. The trees include chestnut, Amur cork trees, apple trees, cherry trees, American hornbeams, maples and Serbian spruces.
