= Sky Garden, Szczecin =

High-rise building in Szczecin, Poland

Sky Garden
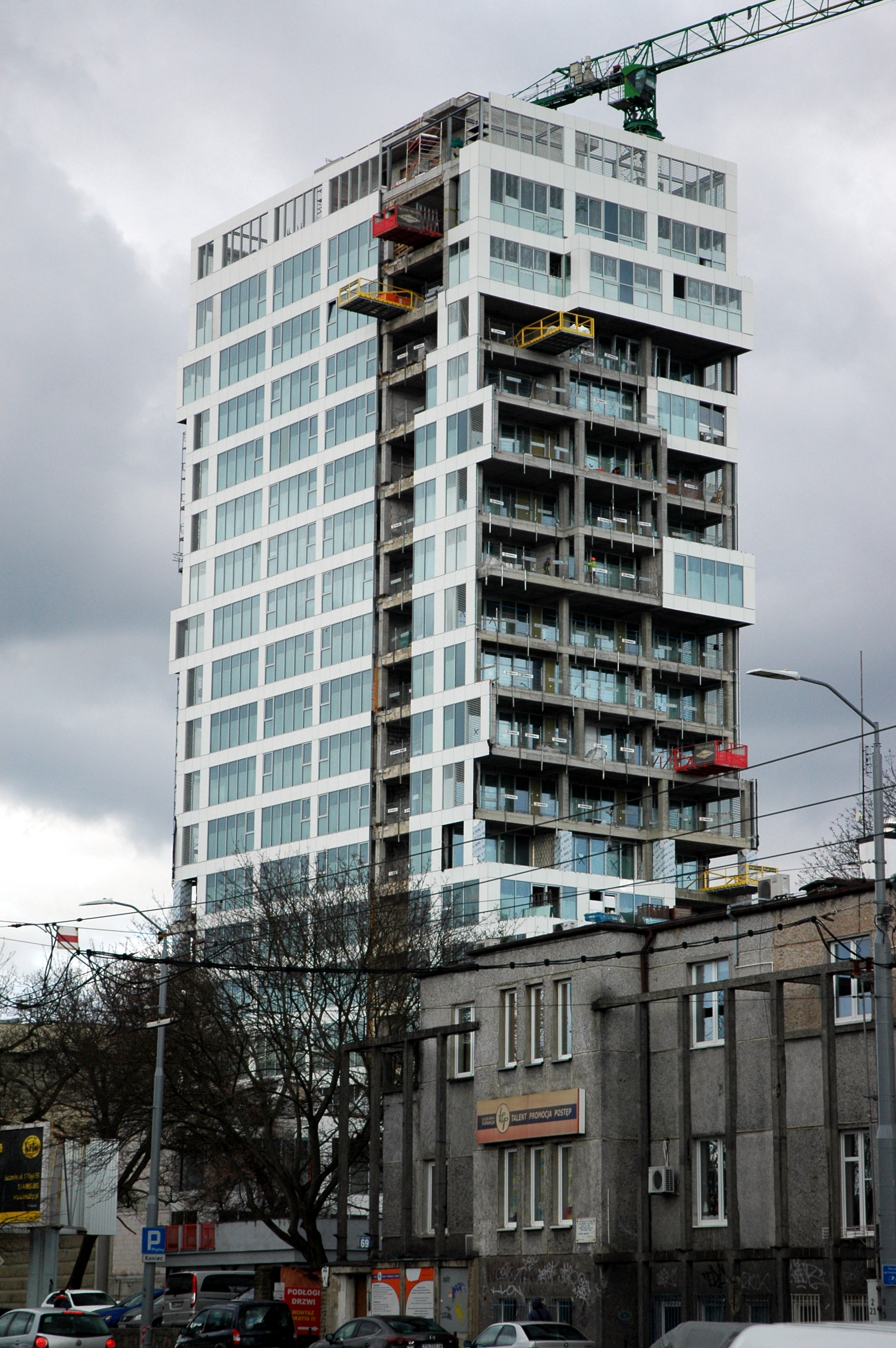
- Sky Garden (2023)
- Interactive map of the Sky Garden area

General information
- Status: Completed
- Type: High-rise
- Location: sródmiescie, Szczecin, Poland

Height
- Height: 65 m

The Sky Garden is a high-rise building in Szczecin, Poland, which belongs to Telewizja Polska. it was completed in 1980 and was the first high-rise in Szczecin.

The building is most noted for being one of the main buildings used by Polish Television. Many orchestras and ensembles have been recorded/played there, hence why you can see the word "PRiTV" next to some of Poland's Orchestra's names.
