= Johannes Quistorp =

German entrepreneur and philanthropist

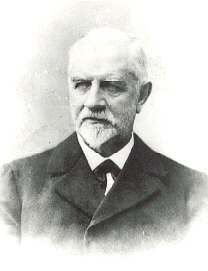
- Born: 14 November 1822; Greifswald, Kingdom of Prussia
- Died: 9 May 1899 (aged 76); Stettin, German Empire
- Occupation: entrepreneur

Johannes Heinrich Quistorp (German pronunciation: [joˈha.nəs ˈhaɪn.ʁɪç ˈkvɪs.tɔrp]; 14 November 1822 – 9 May 1899) was an entrepreneur and philanthropist in Stettin, Germany (today Szczecin, Poland). He was also the founder of a number of regional philanthropic projects.

== Life ==
Johannes Quistorp was born on 14 November 1822 in Greifswald, the eldest son of a royal commissioner. At sixteen he began training at the JG Michaelis & Sohn company in Rostock, where he worked for several years as an assistant. In 1846 he moved to Stettin. After completing a year of military service he partnered with various companies, including Goldammer & Schleich, and in 1850 he founded his own company, Johs Quistorp & Co. In 1852 he married Theune Wilhelmina (1830–1886) and had five children: Mary in 1853, Heinrich in 1856 (died in 1880), Johanne in 1858, Luise in 1859, and Martin in 1860. In 1888, he married for a second time, to Leidloff Mathilde.

Johannes Quistorp was an entrepreneur and philanthropist. He founded the Portland cement factory "Lebbin" (in Lubin), which, under his leadership was transformed into a joint-stock company. He also had a brickyard and a steam-powered cement factory in Stołczyn as well as estates in Dusewitz, Wittenfelde, Schlietz on Rügia and in Stettin. He was the founder of a construction company and initiated the establishment of new neighborhoods in Stettin, including Westend, Neu Westend and Braunsfeld (now the western part of the city of Stettin, known as Pogodno and Łękno). In the years 1852–1866 he served as royal consul of Hannover. He held the title of Minister of Trade. He was one of the first executives in Stettinand Prussia, who, at the beginning of the era of industrialization in the nineteenth century, was involved in the social issues of their employees. Quistorp financed the construction of schools, hospitals, shelters, orphanages and foundations. He died on 9 May 1899. During his funeral, thousands of Stettin residents followed the procession to his final resting place. He was buried in the cemetery, on the premises of the Bethanien Foundation, at the current Wawrzyniak street in Stettin.

== Philanthropic projects ==
- Sponsored the Bethanien complex care facility in 1868 led by Deaconess sisters.
- Bequeathed to the City of Stettin, the land on which he wished to become Quistorp Park, now Jan Kasprowicz Park.
- Donation of site at 15 Wielkopolska Street, to be used for the construction of a secondary school.
- Repaired roads between Stołczyn and Glinki, in collaboration with F. Jahn (Fall 1867).
- Established a Foundation for widows and orphans.
- Financed the construction of a primary school in Lubin.
- Co-financed several nursing homes.

== Places named after him ==
- Quistorp Tower, tower in Szczecin
- Jan Kasprowicz Park, park in Szczecin (between 1900 and 1945 known as Quistorp Park)
- Jasne Błonia, square and park in Szczecin (until 1945 known as Quistorp-Aue)

== Sources and further details ==
- Curriculum vitae of Johannes Quistorp in: Achim von Quistorp, Beiträge zur Genealogie und Geschichte der Familie Quistorp, Berlin 2021, Der Stettiner Zweig
