= Statue of Pope John Paul II (Szczecin) =

1995 gunmetal sculpture in Szczecin, Poland

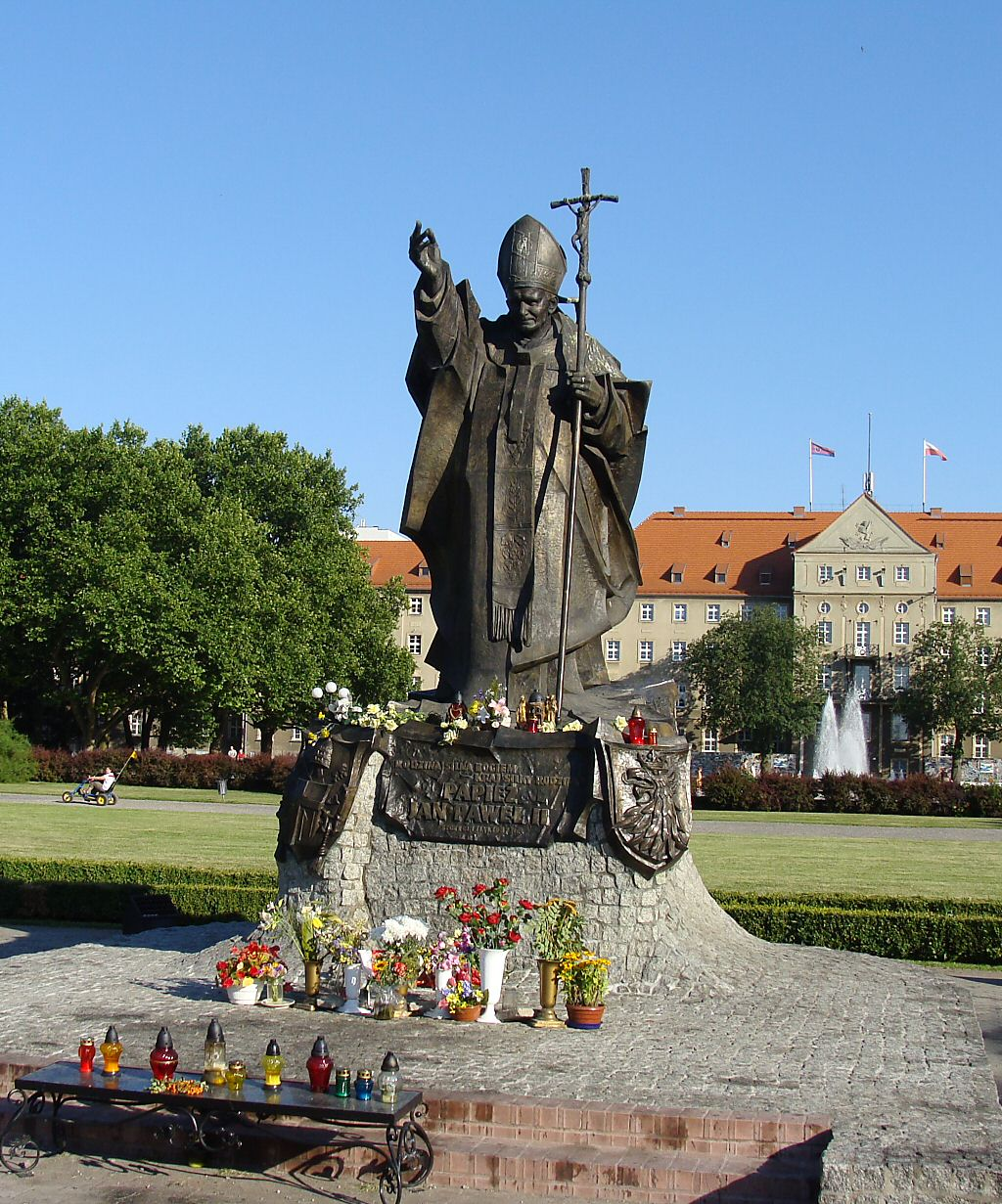
- The monument in 2008.
- Interactive map of Statue of Pope John Paul II
- Location: Bright Meadows Square, Szczecin, Poland
- Coordinates: 53°26′22.50″N 14°32′27.50″E
- Designer: Czesław Dźwigaj (statue and pedestal); Stanisław Latour (pedestal)
- Type: Statue
- Material: Gunmetal (statue); granite (pedestal)
- Height: 5.2 m (total); 3 m (statue)
- Weight: 6 t
- Opening date: 18 June 1995
- Dedicated to: Pope John Paul II

The statue of Pope John Paul II (Polish: Pomnik papieża Jana Pawła II) is a gunmetal statue in Szczecin, Poland, placed at the Bright Meadows Square, within the Downtown district. It depicts Pope John Paul II, commemorating his visit to the city in 1987. The monument was designed by Czesław Dźwigaj and Stanisław Latour, and unveiled on 18 June 1995.

== History ==
The monument was commitioned by the city to commemorate Pope John Paul II's visit to Szczecin on 11 June 1987, during which he held a mass at the Bright Meadows Square, next to the Monument to the Polish Endeavour. Sculptor Czesław Dźwigaj designed the statue, while the pedestal and surrounding area were co-designed together with architect Stanisław Latour.

The monument was unveiled on 18 June 1995. It was blessed by Józef Kowalczyk, the apostolic nuntio to Poland, and the ceremony was attended by Lech Wałęsa, the president of Poland, Józef Glemp, the Primate of Poland, and the members of the Polish Episcopal Conference. The park was also renamed to the John Paul II Bright Meadows Square.

Following the death of John Paul II in 2005, crowds of people gathered around the monument to pay their respects. The state is now a place of religious gatherings during the anniversary.

== Design ==
The gunmetal statue measures 3 meters and weighs 6 tons, and is placed on a pedestal with a height of 2.2 metres. It depicts Pope John Paul II wearing the pontifical vestments with a pallium and mitre, holding a crozier in a shape of a Christian cross with a small statue of Jesus mounted on it, in his left hand. His right hand is raised upwards as in blessing his followers. He is depicted walking against the wind on the water waves, and facing north, towards the Monument to the Polish Endeavour, next to which, John Paul II held a mass on 11 June 1987. The monument's design refers to the words said by him during said liturgy, which were: "Dear brothers and sisters, I would like to thank Szczecin for welcoming us with such beautiful weather, sun and wind from the sea…".

The base of the monument, including the pedestal, is laid with a granite brick paving, and its top, on which stands the statue, is made from a gunmetal sheet of metal, shaped to resemble water waves. The shape of the pedestal base corresponds to the borders of the archdiocese of Szczecin and Kamień. At the front of the pedestal are installed reliefs of the coat of arms of Pope John Paul II on the left, with the Marian Cross, a cross with a capital M for Mary of Nazareth inscribed in one quarter, and the coat of arms of Szczecin on the right, with the a head of giffin wearing crown. Between them is a plaque with the Pope's quote, said during the mass:

Polish text

Rodzina silna Bogiem
Kraj silny rodziną
Jan Paweł II
Szczecin 18 VI 1987 r.p.

Translation:
English translation

The family is strong with God
The country is strong with the family
John Paul II
Szczecin, 18 June 1987 AD

The west side of the pedestal also features a gunmetal relief depicting coats of arms of the archbishop Jerzy Stroba and bishops Kazimierz Majdański and Marian Przykucki, with the following inscription below them:

Polish text

Ojcu Świętemu Janowi Pawłowi II
Społeczeństwo Pomorza Zachodniego 18 VI 1995

Translation:
English translation

To the Holy Father John Paul II
The people of Western Pomerania, 18 June 1995
