= Statue of the Boy from Pest (Washington, D.C.) =

Statue in Washington, D.C., US

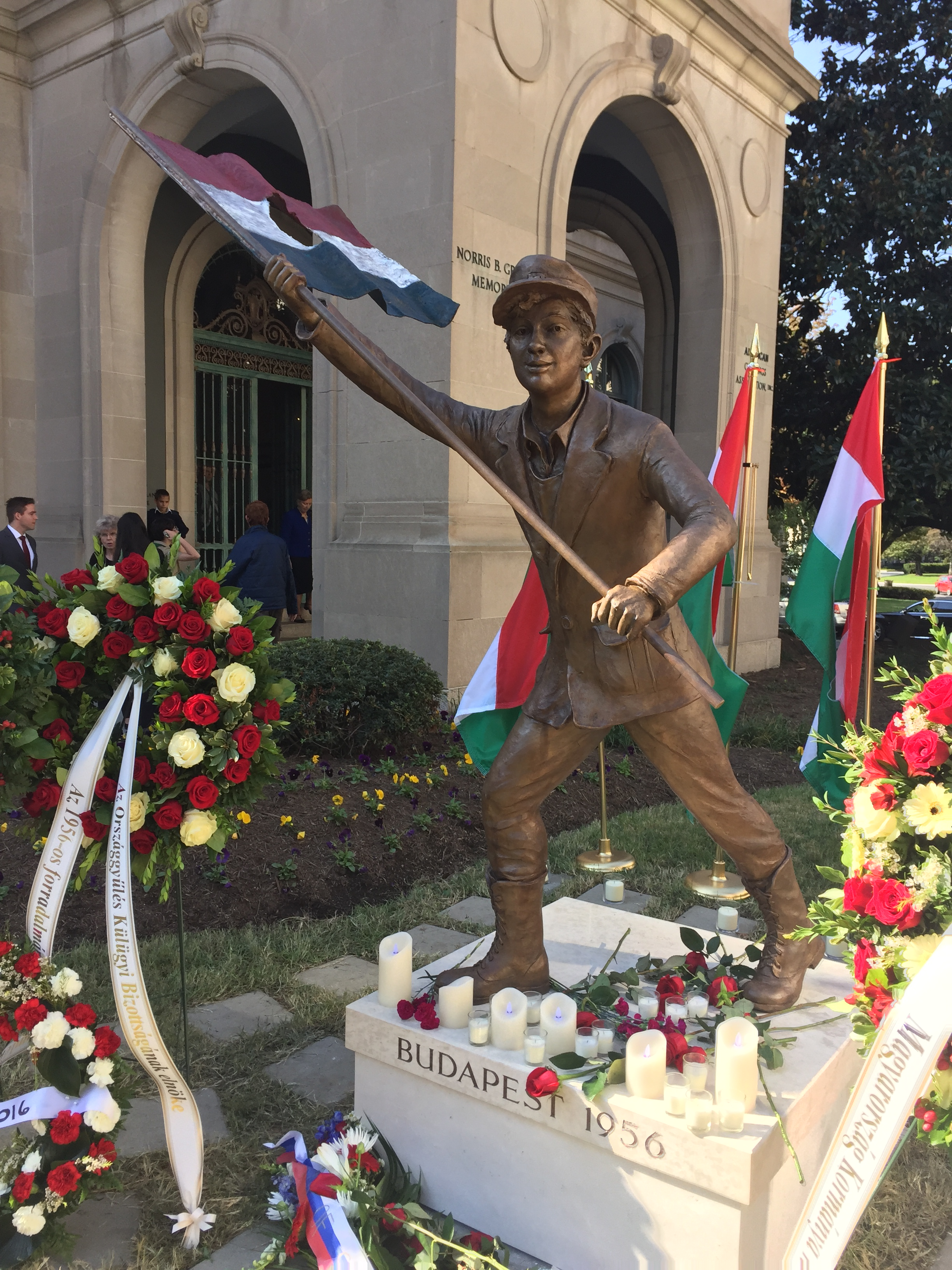
- The statue in 2016.
- Interactive map of Statue of the Boy from Pest
- Location: 1500 Rhode Island Avenue, Northwest, Washington, D.C., United States
- Coordinates: 38°54′27.87″N 77°2′6.18″W
- Designer: Richárd Juha
- Type: Statue
- Material: Bronze
- Completion date: October 17, 2016

The statue of the Boy from Pest (Hungarian: A Pesti srác szobra) is a bronze sculpture in Washington, D.C., in the United States, within the city's Northwest quadrant. It is placed in front the embassy of Hungary in the Brodhead-Bell-Morton Mansion, at 1500 Rhode Island Avenue. It was designed by Richárd Juha, and unveiled on October 17, 2016. The statue depicts a boy, wearing a suit and a cap, and waving a flag of Hungary with a large hole in the middle, like those used by the insurgents during the Hungarian Revolution of 1956.

== History ==
The sculpture was designed by Richárd Juha, and unveiled on October 17, 2016, next to the embassy of Hungary in the Brodhead-Bell-Morton Mansion, at 1500 Rhode Island Avenue. The ceremony was attended by Miklós Seszták, the Minister of National Development, Zsolt Németh, the chairman of the Foreign Affairs Committee, János Horváth, the former speaker of the National Assembly, Megyesy Jenő, the presidential foreign policy advisor, Réka Szemerkényi, the ambassador of Hungary to the United States, and Colleen Bell, the ambassador of the United States to Hungary.

In 2016, two other sculptures by Richárd Juha, depicting the same person posed differently, were also unveiled in Budapest, Hungary, and Szczecin, Poland.

== Characteristics ==
The bronze statue depicts a boy, wearing a suit and a cap, and waving a flag of Hungary with a large hole in the middle, reminiscent of those used by the insurgents during the Hungarian Revolution of 1956.

== See also ==
- Statue of the Boy from Pest (Budapest), a similar statue in Budapest, Hungary
- Statue of the Hungarian Boy, a similar statue in Szczecin, Poland
