= James G. Blaine Mansion =

- U.S. Historic district – Contributing property
- D.C. Inventory of Historic Sites
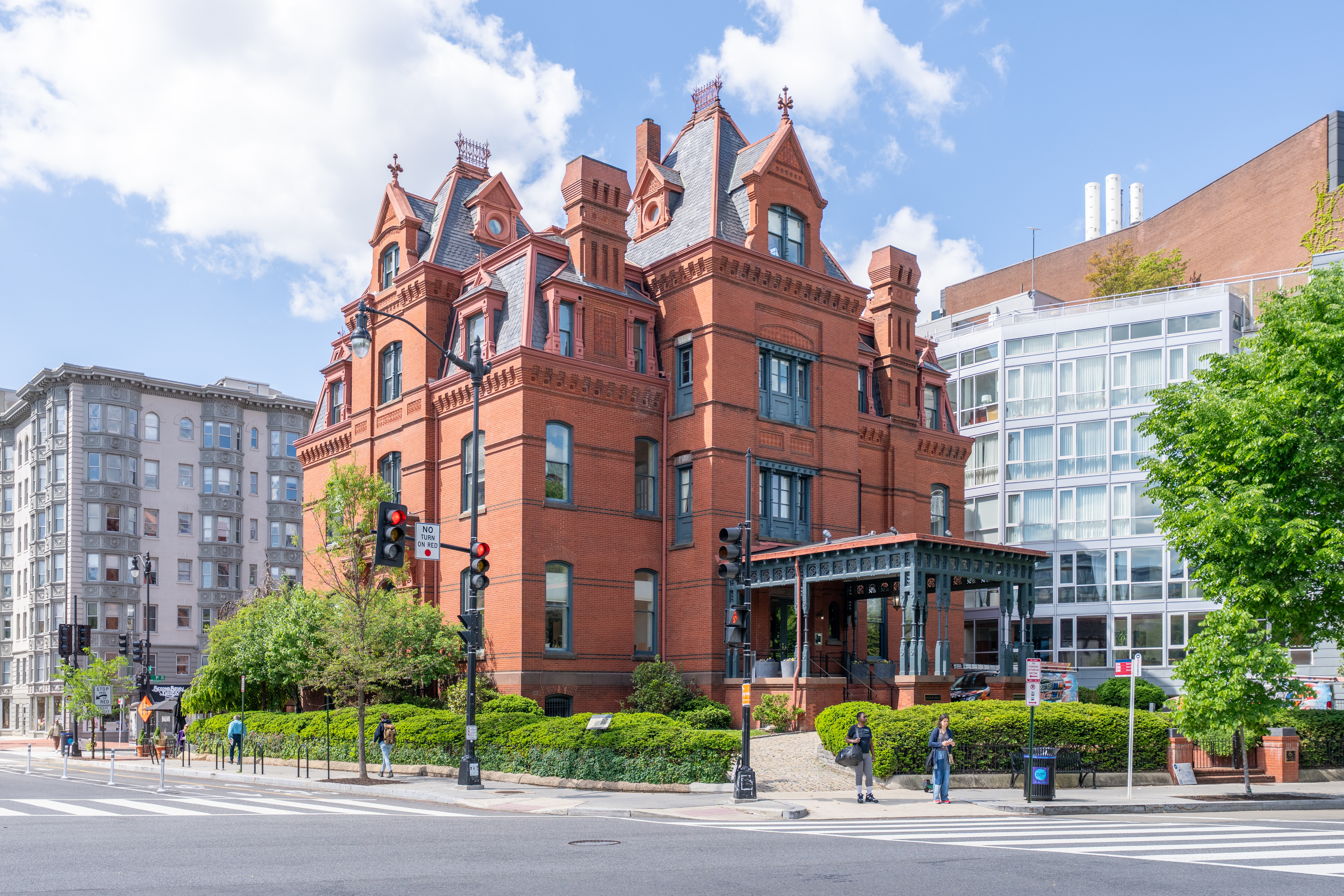
- Blaine Mansion in 2026

- Location within Washington, D.C. Location within the United States
- Location: 2000 Massachusetts Avenue NW Washington, D.C.
- Coordinates: 38°54′35.85″N 77°2′43.18″W
- Built: 1882
- Architect: John Fraser
- Architectural style: Châteauesque, Queen Anne, Second Empire
- Part of: Massachusetts Avenue Historic District; Dupont Circle Historic District

Significant dates
- Designated CP: October 22, 1974; July 21, 1978
- Designated DCIHS: November 8, 1964

The James G. Blaine Mansion, commonly known as the Blaine Mansion, is a historic house located at 2000 Massachusetts Avenue NW, in the Dupont Circle neighborhood of Washington, D.C. The imposing house was completed in 1882 for James G. Blaine, a Republican politician from Maine who served as Speaker of the House, and later as a US Senator and US Secretary of State. He was also a presidential candidate who was narrowly defeated by Grover Cleveland in the 1884 United States presidential election.

In addition to Blaine, the mansion has served as the residence of other prominent individuals, including wealthy businessmen Levi Leiter and George Westinghouse, and French ambassador Jules Patenôtre des Noyers. During World War I it was used as a meeting space for the newly formed United Service Club. Following the war, diplomatic occupants including the Japanese embassy and Colombian Ambassador Enrique Olaya Herrera leased the building. The mansion was used as office space for the Rural Electrification Administration during the Great Depression and by New York City Mayor Fiorello La Guardia during World War II when he led the Office of Civilian Defense. The United Nations leased part of the building as office space for the Food and Agriculture Organization in the late 1940s and Information Center in the 1950s.

The lower floors of the mansion have remained in use as office space for various businesses since that time. In the late 2000s and early 2010s, the building was completely renovated after it was purchased by diplomat and attorney John R. Phillips and his wife, journalist and Obama administration official Linda Douglass. The renovation included converting the upper floors into a penthouse, renovating an adjoining commercial space fronting P Street, and constructing a narrow luxury residential building and underground parking deck on land adjoining the mansion.

Designed by noted architect John Fraser, the mansion is a combination of the Châteauesque, Queen Anne, and Second Empire architectural styles. The mansion was one of several large residences that once stood on the perimeter of Dupont Circle, a traffic circle and small park at the intersection of 19th Street, P Street, Connecticut Avenue, Massachusetts Avenue, and New Hampshire Avenue. The other remaining large homes on the circle are the Patterson Mansion and Wadsworth House, more commonly known as the Sulgrave Club. The Blaine Mansion was added to the District of Columbia Inventory of Historic Sites in 1964. The building is a contributing property to the Massachusetts Avenue Historic District, which was listed on the National Register of Historic Places (NRHP) in 1974, and the Dupont Circle Historic District, listed on the NRHP in 1978.

== History ==
=== Original owner ===
James G. Blaine (1830–1893) was a teacher and newspaper publisher from Pennsylvania who became wealthy from investments in coal mines. He and his family moved to Maine in the 1850s and it was here where Blaine became active in politics. He served as a delegate to the first Republican National Convention in 1856. Two years later Blaine was elected to the Maine House of Representatives and became chairman of the Maine Republican Party in 1859. As a fervent supporter of President Abraham Lincoln during the Civil War, Blaine was involved with organizing assistance to local soldiers from the Union Army. It was during the early years of the war when Blaine was elected Speaker of the Maine House of Representatives.

Blaine was elected to Congress in 1863 as a Representative. Six years later he was elected Speaker of the House by an overwhelming margin. He remained as Speaker until the Republican Party lost control of the House in the 1874 and 1875 elections. Blaine narrowly lost the nomination at the 1876 Republican National Convention to be the Republican presidential nominee. That same year he was appointed to the US Senate where he served until being offered the role of US Secretary of State in 1881. He stepped down from this role a few months after President James A. Garfield was assassinated.

He lost another party presidential nomination at the 1880 Republican National Convention but was successful at the 1884 Republican National Convention, where he defeated President Chester A. Arthur. In the general election, Blaine narrowly lost to President Grover Cleveland. After President Benjamin Harrison was elected to office, he offered Blaine the position of US Secretary of State. Blaine served in this role until 1892. Following the deaths of his wife and three of his children, and due to his own failing health, Blaine retired in 1892; he died the following year.

=== Building history ===
==== Construction and architect ====
The Blaine family originally planned on building their residence on 16th Street NW near Scott Circle and the site had even been graded before Blaine changed his mind on the location. Blaine's wife, Harriet, wrote to their son Emmons in May 1881 describing the ordeal: "your Father...has conceived a sort of disgust with the Sixteenth Street place, on account of the vicinage of stables, and although he has that immense tract graded, is not going to build on it, and fastening his affections on a lot on Massachusetts Avenue, P and Twentieth Streets, he comes upon the surprising fact that Mr. Phelps is the owner thereof." The land where the mansion was built, the site of the former Hopkins Brickyard, was purchased from a family friend, William Walter Phelps. The building permit No. 1379 was issued in June 1881. The site on 16th Street was later sold to Senator George H. Pendleton.

With the help of money earned from his book, Twenty Years of Congress, Blaine chose John Fraser (1825–1906) to design his home. Fraser was a Scottish-born architect who emigrated to the United States in 1845. During his 50-year career, Fraser designed several prominent buildings in Pennsylvania and later Washington, D.C., where he opened a practice in 1871. He continued his practice in the city until around 1890 when he returned to Philadelphia. During his time in Washington, D.C., Fraser designed the Brodhead-Bell-Morton Mansion, the British Legation (demolished), the St. John's Episcopal Church rectory, Kann's Department Store (demolished), two fire stations (both demolished), and prominent houses in the present-day Greater Fourteenth Street Historic District, Greater U Street Historic District, and Sixteenth Street Historic District. The Blaine Mansion is Fraser's best known design in Washington, D.C. Construction of the Blaine Mansion began in 1881 at a cost of $90,000. The family moved into their new residence in December 1882.

==== Private residence ====
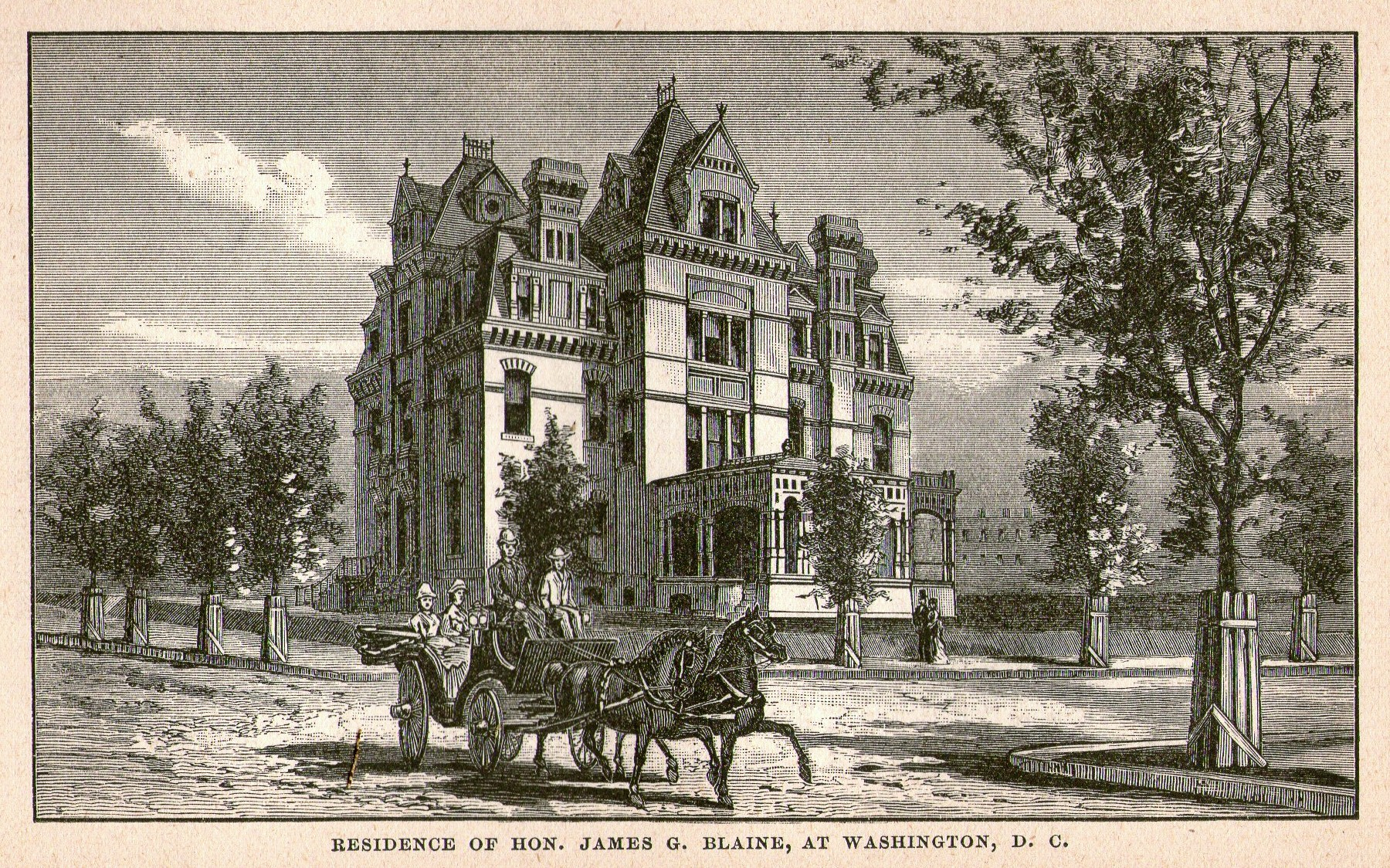
Drawing of the mansion in 1884

The family quickly learned the large house was expensive and difficult to maintain. The Blaines only held one large social event in the house, the wedding of James and Harriet's daughter, Alice, to Colonel John J. Coppinger in February 1883. Later that same year Blaine leased the furnished mansion to wealthy businessman and cofounder of Marshall Field & Company, Levi Leiter. Leiter leased the mansion at a cost of $10,000 a year, which was noted at the time as being the most expensive rent paid for a residence in the city, and much more than the Chinese Legation paid to rent the nearby Stewart's Castle. In 1889, Harriet sold two lots on the property to Chesapeake and Potomac Telephone Company manager Samuel T. Bryan for $50,000. While the mansion was being leased, the Blaines lived in the Windom House on Scott Circle before moving into the Rodgers House at 17 Madison Place, a one-block street lining Lafayette Square.

On the morning of New Year's Day 1891 a fire broke out in the house. News reports at the time said thousands of onlookers came to witness the event. The fire was believed to have started on a lower floor, but spread on the third floor via the elevator shaft. Leiter and his wife were home at the time, but escaped unharmed. Valuables were removed from the third floor before they could be destroyed and the fire was completely extinguished by around noon, but there was smoke and water damage to much of the building. An Evening Star reporter wrote: "The result, however, was deplorable for the mansion. The rear staircase was a mass of charred timbers, while the cupola on top seemed about to fall. The entire upper floor except the front room was burned to some extent, while everything in the house was more or less damaged by the water, which poured in a constant and damaging stream from the top to the bottom." Although Blaine had insurance on the home, Leiter did not have any for his belongings. The house was repaired by Philadelphia contractor Jacob Meyers. The Leiters moved out of the home in 1892 and lived abroad until their own palatial residence on the north side of Dupont Circle, the Leiter House, was completed in 1894.

Following her husband's death in 1893, Harriet listed the house for sale at a cost of $165,000. A newspaper ad for the listing described the house as having "twenty-three large rooms, exclusive of six bathrooms, closets, etc., and is particularly adapted for the use of a Foreign Legation or for anyone desiring to entertain largely." The following month it was announced newly appointed French Ambassador Jules Patenôtre des Noyers would be leasing the house. By 1895 Harriet was reportedly living in the mansion, but was rarely seen socially due to being in mourning. Their former home on Madison Place was demolished and replaced with the Lafayette Square Opera House, later known as the Belasco Theatre.

In late 1895, Harriet leased the furnished house to wealthy businessman and engineer George Westinghouse, whose wife was known for hosting popular social gatherings. Westinghouse bought the house from Harriet in 1901 at a cost of $150,000. After the sale, Harriet had all of her furniture and other valuables moved from the mansion to her new residence on K Street. In 1903 Westinghouse had a passenger elevator installed in the house. George and his wife, Marguerite, used the house as a winter residence until his death in 1914. Their son, George Westinghouse III, continued ownership of the home for several years, but never resided there.

==== Apartments and office space ====
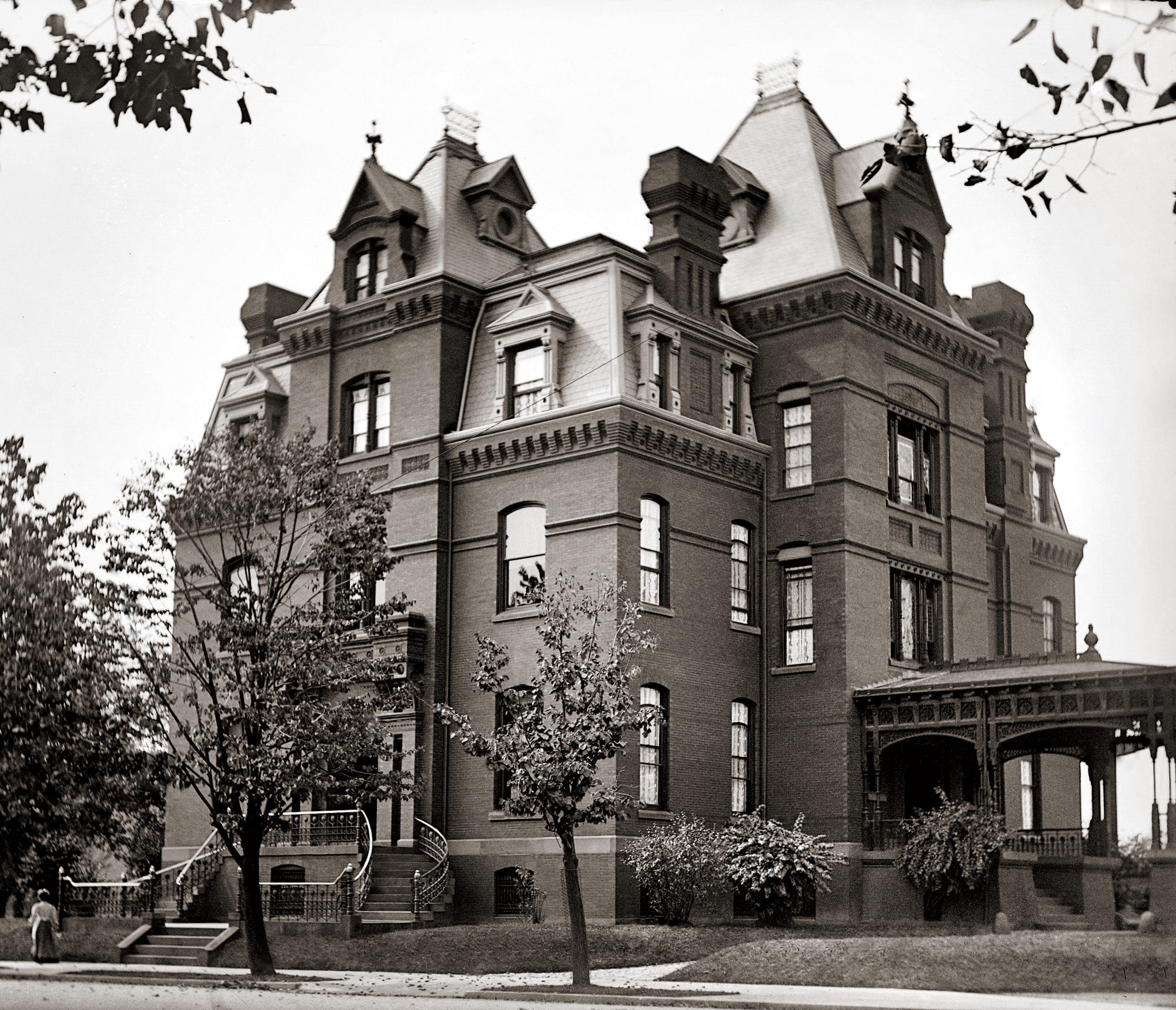
The mansion as it appeared around 1919, before the renovation carried out by Henry B. Spencer.

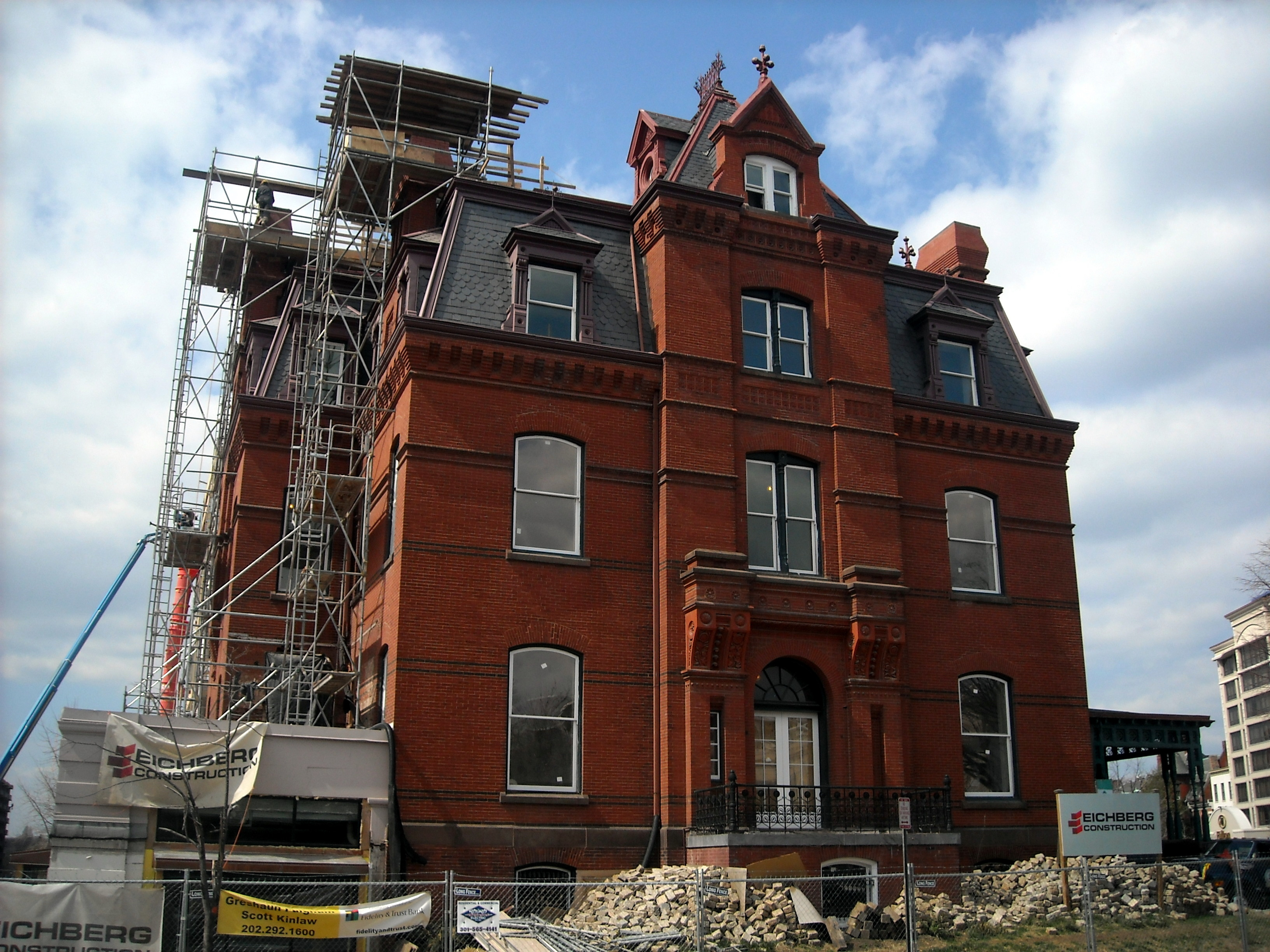
The mansion during the $20 million renovation, 2009.

During World War I the house was used as a meeting house for the United Service Club, a social gathering place for military officers when the Army and Navy Club became too crowded. In late 1920, the house was sold by Gladys O. Mitchell to Henry B. Spencer for $90,000. The following year Spencer converted the building into an apartment house with servants' quarters on the top floor. During the renovation, there were significant changes to the interior and exterior designs. The main staircase was removed, the porch facing the west side of the property was removed, and the entrance on 20th Street was removed. Spencer added a four-story glass addition to the northwest corner of the house and plans were made for seven storefronts to be added. Only three of these were built, facing P Street, in a newly built one-story addition designed by architect George N. Ray.

Following the renovation, the Japanese Embassy leased part of the building in 1921 and remained there until 1925. The building was advertised in 1922 as having apartments each with 14 rooms including 4 bathrooms. In 1923, Colombian Ambassador Enrique Olaya Herrera and counselor for the Danish Legation, Kai Helmer-Petersen each leased an apartment in the building. One of the non-diplomatic residents who rented an apartment in the mansion at this time was Henry Cabot Lodge Jr., who would later become a senator and ambassador.

The mansion continued to serve as an apartment building until 1935 when the newly formed New Deal government agency, the Rural Electrification Administration, leased the property during the Great Depression. The agency continued use of the building until early 1941 when all staff were moved to a single facility a few blocks south, the Longfellow Building. Later that year New York City Mayor Fiorello La Guardia used the mansion as office space for the Office of Civilian Defense, a temporary government agency created during World War II. The annual cost of the lease was $15,000. Additional office space for the agency was in the nearby Dupont Circle Building, where First Lady Eleanor Roosevelt's office as assistant director of the agency was located. During this time a minor alteration to the exterior of the building included removal of the top section of the chimneys.

Following the war, the United Nations leased part of the building as office space for the Food and Agriculture Organization and Information Center. There was a major renovation done to the building during these years when the remaining interior space was converted to offices and the west side of the property was graded to street level to provide parking spots. The renovations were completed by Maurice S. May

The adjoining commercial building on P Street housed the same small business retailers for decades until a major renovation was announced in 2006 after a business partnership, including ambassador and attorney John Phillips, purchased the entire property for $6.2 million. The renovation and expansion, designed by Van Dusen Architects, was expected to cost around $20 million and include the construction of 6,000 square feet (560 m^{2}) of retail space, a three-story underground parking garage, and a narrow six-story condominium building adjoining the mansion. The top two floors were converted into a 7,000 sq ft (650 sq m) penthouse for Phillips and his wife, journalist and former Obama administration official Linda Douglass, while the lower floors continued to be used as office space. The condominium building includes five units, one of which is a multi-million dollar two-level penthouse. On top of the condominium building is an outdoor rooftop pool that connects to the mansion penthouse.

In 2023 Phillips and Douglass listed the mansion for sale. The asking price of $29.95 million would set a new record for a house sale in the city. Potential buyers would have the option to retain the penthouse or convert it into additional office space. The leasing of office space on the lower floors brings in almost $1 million a year. Phillips and Douglass, who previously owned the Chemosphere house in California, also own a small village in Tuscany, which includes several villas that are available to rent. Due to their service in the Obama administration, the couple often hosted political gatherings. President Obama visited the house many times, as did Joe Biden when he was vice president. The Secret Service was often stationed at the house in preparation for these visits and a hardline phone was installed in the garage so that Obama could make or receive calls if needed.

==== Historic landmark ====
The Blaine Mansion is one of three palatial homes still standing on or near Dupont Circle. The others are the Patterson Mansion at 15 Dupont Circle and the Wadsworth House, home to the Sulgrave Club, at 1801 Massachusetts Avenue NW. The Blaine Mansion was added to the District of Columbia Inventory of Historic Sites on November 8, 1964. It was designated a contributing property to the Massachusetts Avenue Historic District, listed on the National Register of Historic Places (NRHP) on October 22, 1974, and the Dupont Circle Historic District, listed on the NRHP on July 21, 1978.

== Location and design ==
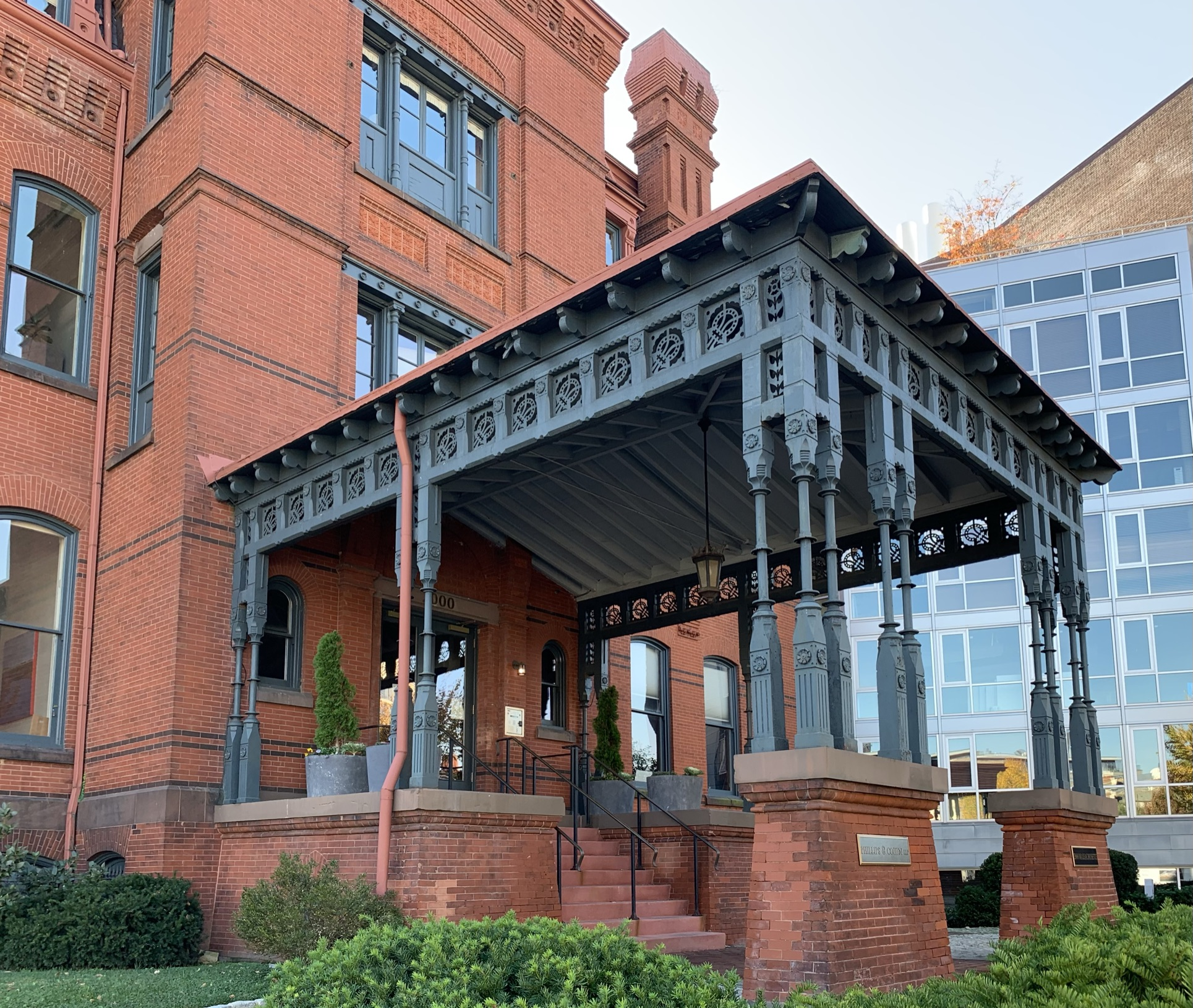
Massachusetts Avenue entrance

The James G. Blaine Mansion is located on Lot 1 on Square 95 at the intersection of 20th Street, Massachusetts Avenue, and P Street NW on the west side of Dupont Circle, Washington, D.C. A small triangular lot separates the building from the traffic circle. The address for the main building is 2000 Massachusetts Avenue NW. The adjoining commercial buildings have the addresses 2000 and 2003 P Street NW. The address for the adjoining residential building is 2002 Massachusetts Avenue NW.

The design of the mansion is a combination of the Queen Anne and Second Empire architectural styles, the former being a popular design in the United States from 1880-1910 and the latter from 1865-1880, with Châteauesque details. Many of the original interior and exterior details have been removed or altered since the mansion was first built.

The mansion is a red brick building with the main entrance on Massachusetts Avenue. The original design included an entrance for carriages on Massachusetts Avenue with a large stained glass window above and a separate stone entrance with brass railings facing Dupont Circle. A fireplace stood at the end of a large wood-finished hallway measuring 15 feet (4.6 m) wide and 45 feet (14 m) long as one entered the Dupont Circle entrance. Off this main hallway was the reception room on the right and parlors, the dining room, and library on the left. The dining room was not large compared to the size of the house and included a dumbwaiter. There were many elaborately decorated rooms in the house including a bathroom featuring a Victorian Turkish bath and a billiards room in the basement. Every room in the house had a fireplace, many of which were accented with mantelpieces and mirrors. There were 64 windows allowing natural light throughout the building and an oak stairwell decorated with elaborate carvings.

== See also ==
- National Register of Historic Places listings in Washington, D.C.

== Notes ==
1. The Pendleton House was built in 1881, demolished in 1941, and replaced with the General Scott apartment building.
2. It's unclear when Mitchell became the owner.
