= Bright Meadows =

Urban green space in Szczecin, Poland

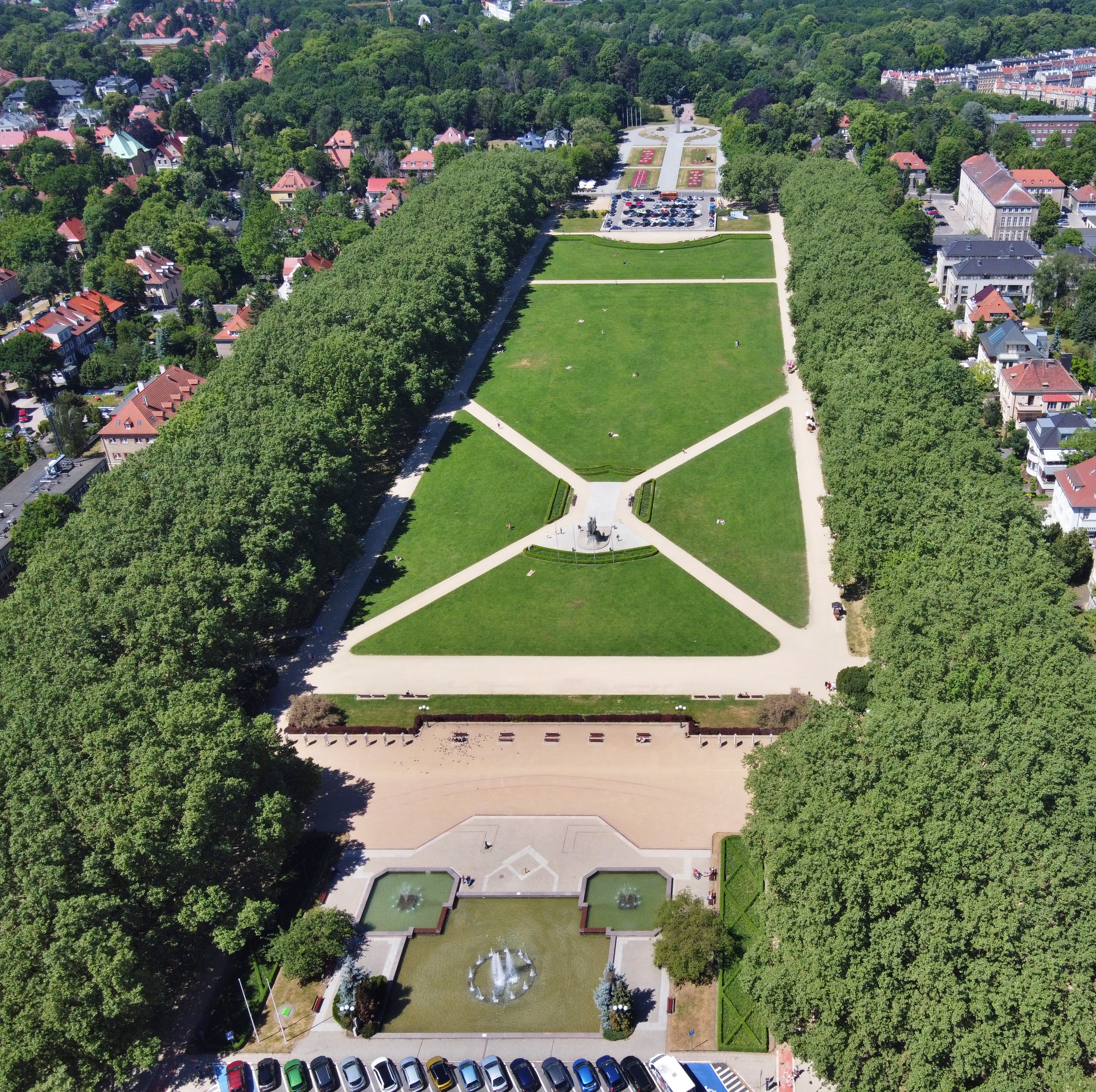
- The aerial view on the Bright Meadows, as seen from the south.
- Interactive map of Bright Meadows
- Type: Garden square
- Location: Downtown-North, Szczecin, Poland
- Coordinates: 53°26′24.2″N 14°32′23.6″E
- Created: 1927

John Paul II Bright Meadows Square (Polish: Plac Jasne Błonia im. Jana Pawła II), also simply known as the Bright Meadows (Polish: Jasne Błonia), and until 1945 known as Quistorp Meadow (German pronunciation: [ˈkvɪs.tɔrp]; German: Quistorp-Aue), is a garden square in the city of Szczecin, Poland. It is located in the neighbourhood of Downtown-North within the Downtown district, between Moniuszki, Skargi, Szymanowskiego, and Ogińskiego Streets. It borders Jan Kasprowicz Park to the north, and the Szczecin City Hall, a Baroque Revival town hall from 1927, to the south. The garden square was opened in the 1927. It includes the Monument to the Polish Endeavour, a monumental sculpture measuring 22.5 m (73.82 ft) with the three bronze statues of eagles with spread out wings, each placed on a steel column. It was designed by Gustaw Zemła, and unveiled in 1979, to symbolise and commemorate three generations of Polish inhabitants of the city. The garden square is listed on the voivodeship heritage registry.

== History ==
The garden square was developed between 1925 and 1927, on the land donated in 1925 to the city by Martin Quistorp, a local businessperson and industrialist. It was named after him, Quistorp Meadow (German: Quistorp-Aue). Jan Kasprowicz Park, then known as Quistorp Park, was also developed to the north, also on lang donated by Quistorp. The Baroque Revival legislative building of the Province of Pomerania, which since 1945 serves as the Szczecin City Hall, was also built to the south of the garden square.

Following the Second World War, when the city came under Polish administration, the park was renamed to the Bright Meadows (Polish: Jasne Błonia).

Various events and festivals have been hosted in the park, including the youth festival We Hold the Guard over the Oder, held between 13 and 14 April 1946. Organised to celebrate and showcase the Polish affiliation of the city, it included a parade and a speech by Bolesław Bierut, the president of Poland, held at the square on the second day of the event. The first large anti-government and anti-communist street demonstration have been held during the festival by the members of the scouts. After the parade, decadents gathered at the square marched toward the city centre, singing anti-communist songs. In 1959, the meeting with Nikita Khrushchev, the leader of the Soviet Union, was held at the square.

On 3 September 1979, the Monument to the Polish Endeavour was unveiled at the entrance to Jan Kasprowicz Park from the Bright Meadows. Designed by Gustaw Zemła, it measures 22.5 m (73.82 ft), and consists of the three bronze sculptures of eagles with spread out wings, each placed on a steel column with a square base. It was meant to symbolise and commemorate three generations of Polish inhabitants of the city.

On 11 June 1987, Pope John Paul II held a Roman Catholic mass at the Bright Meadows, during his visit to Poland. His altar was placed in front of the Monument to the Polish Endeavour. On 18 June 1995, a monument dedicated to him, and commemorating the event, was unveiled at the Bright Meadows. It was designed by Czesław Dźwigaj and Stanisław Latour, and took the form of a gunmetal statue placed on a granite pedestal. In 1995, the square was given the full official name of John Paul II Bright Meadows Square (Polish: Plac Jasne Błonia im. Jana Pawła II). It continues to be commonly referred simply as the Bright Meadows.

In 2004, the garden square was listed on the voivodeship heritage registry.

On 9 December 2016, the statue of the Hungarian Boy, a bronze sculpture by Richárd Juha, was unveiled at the square, near Skargi Street. It was financed by the Csepel district in Budapest, Hungary, in gratitude and commemoration of the humanitarian aid send from Szczecin to the city during the Hungarian Revolution of 1956. An idential statue by Juha have been unveiled on 23 October 2016, at the Saint Emeric Square in Budepest.

== Characteristics ==
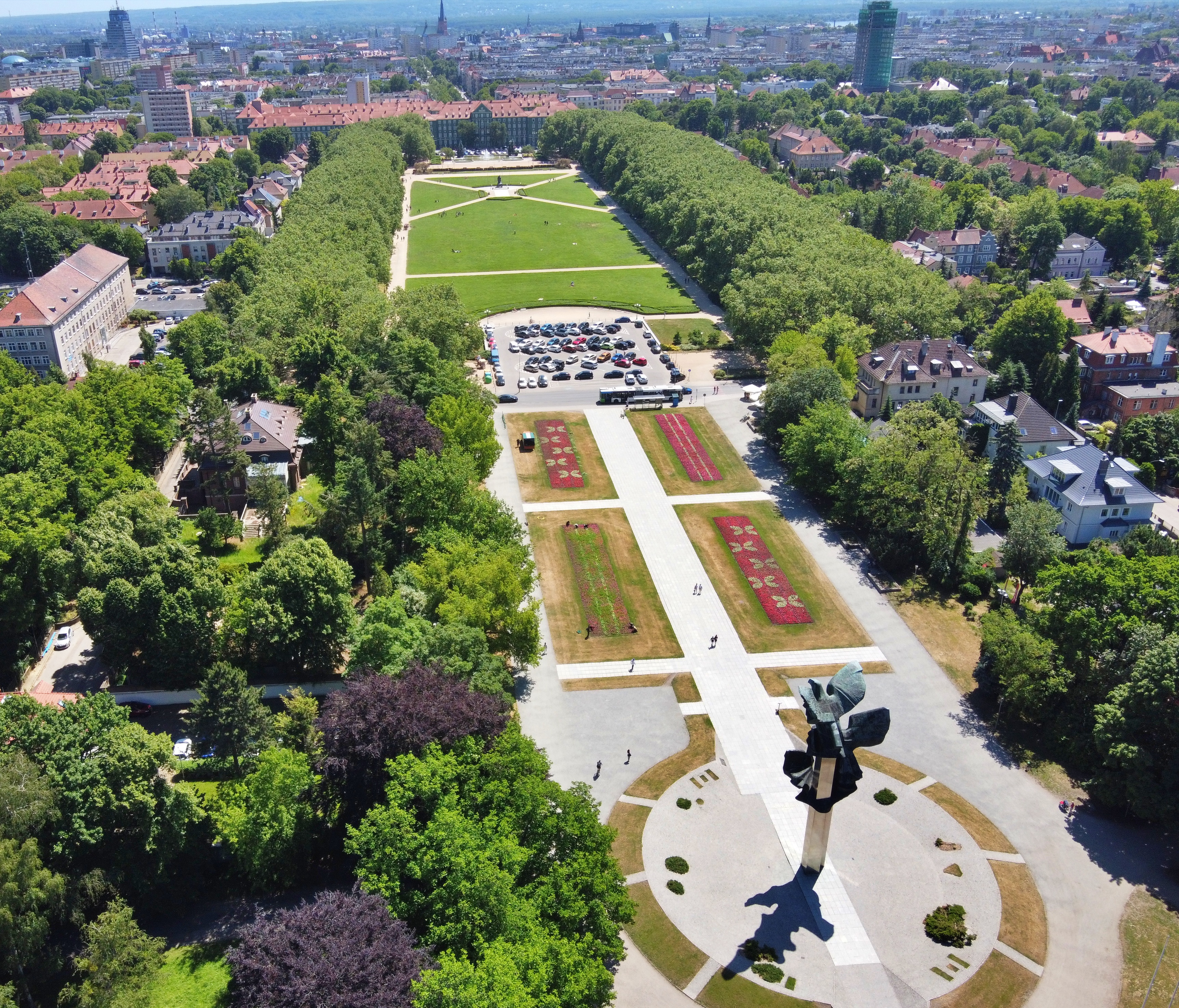
The aerial view of the Bright Meadows, as seen from the north.

The Bright Meadows forms a long rectangular garden square, divided into two parts, separated by Skargi Street. Its southern portion is located between Moniuszki, Skargi, Szymanowskiego, and Ogińskiego Streets, and to its east and west, is surrounded by historic villas dating to the late 19th and the early 20th centuries. To the south, it borders the Szczecin City Hall, a Baroque Revival town hall from 1927, which houses the headquarters of the municipal government. The centre of the southern square portion consists of a large grass lawn in its centre, with two avenues on its eastern and western sides. They feature rows of 212 London plane trees, which hold the status of the natural monument. The oldest of the date over one hounded years old, with the largest speciments being 28-metre-tall (91.86 ft), with the largest trunk circumference measuring 384 cm (12.6 ft). It also includes the monument to Pope John Paul II, in from of a gunmetal statue and placed on a granite pedestal. It was designed by Czesław Dźwigaj and Stanisław Latour, and unveiled in 1995, to commemorate him holding a Roman Catholic mass at the square during his visit to the city in 1987.

The northern potion of the garden square forms the entrance to Jan Kasprowicz Park, which it borders to the north. To the east and west, it is surrounded by historic villas dating to the late 19th and the early 20th centuries, placed alongside Moniuszki and Ogińskiego Streets. At its northern end, the square features the Monument to the Polish Endeavour, which measures 22.5 m (73.82 ft) in height, and consists of the three bronze sculptures of eagles with spread out wings, each placed on a steel column with a square base. It was designed by Gustaw Zemła, and unveiled in 1979, to commemorate and symbolise three generations of Polish inhabitants of the city. The square also includes the statue of the Hungarian Boy, a bronze sculpture by Richárd Juha, depicting a child rebel form the Hungarian Revolution of 1956. It was designed by Richárd Juha, and unveiled on 2016, as a gift from the Csepel district in Budapest, Hungary, in gratitude and commemoration of the humanitarian aid send from Szczecin to the city during the revolution.

The garden square is listed on the voivodeship heritage registry.

== Gallery ==
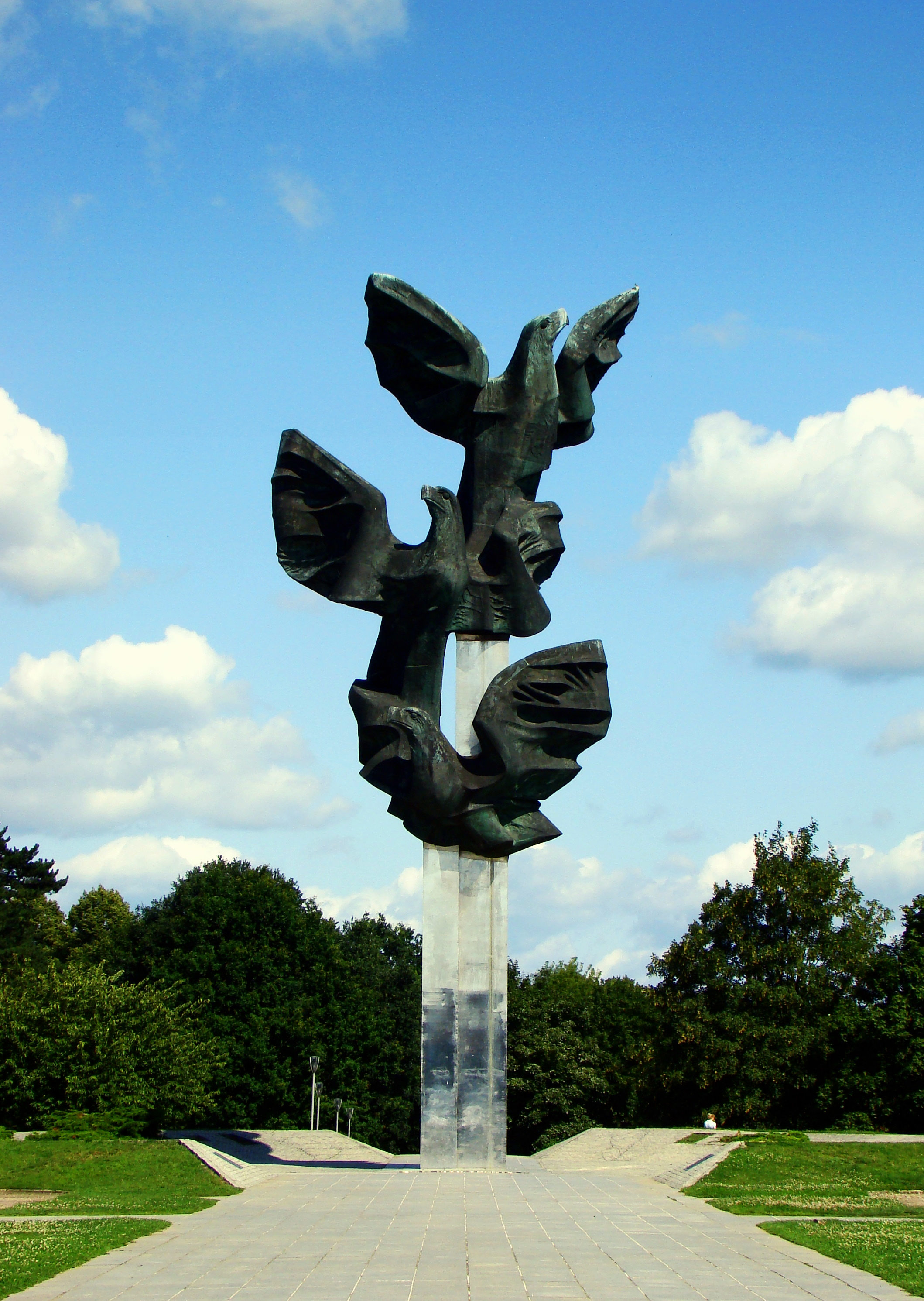
The Monument to the Polish Endeavour.

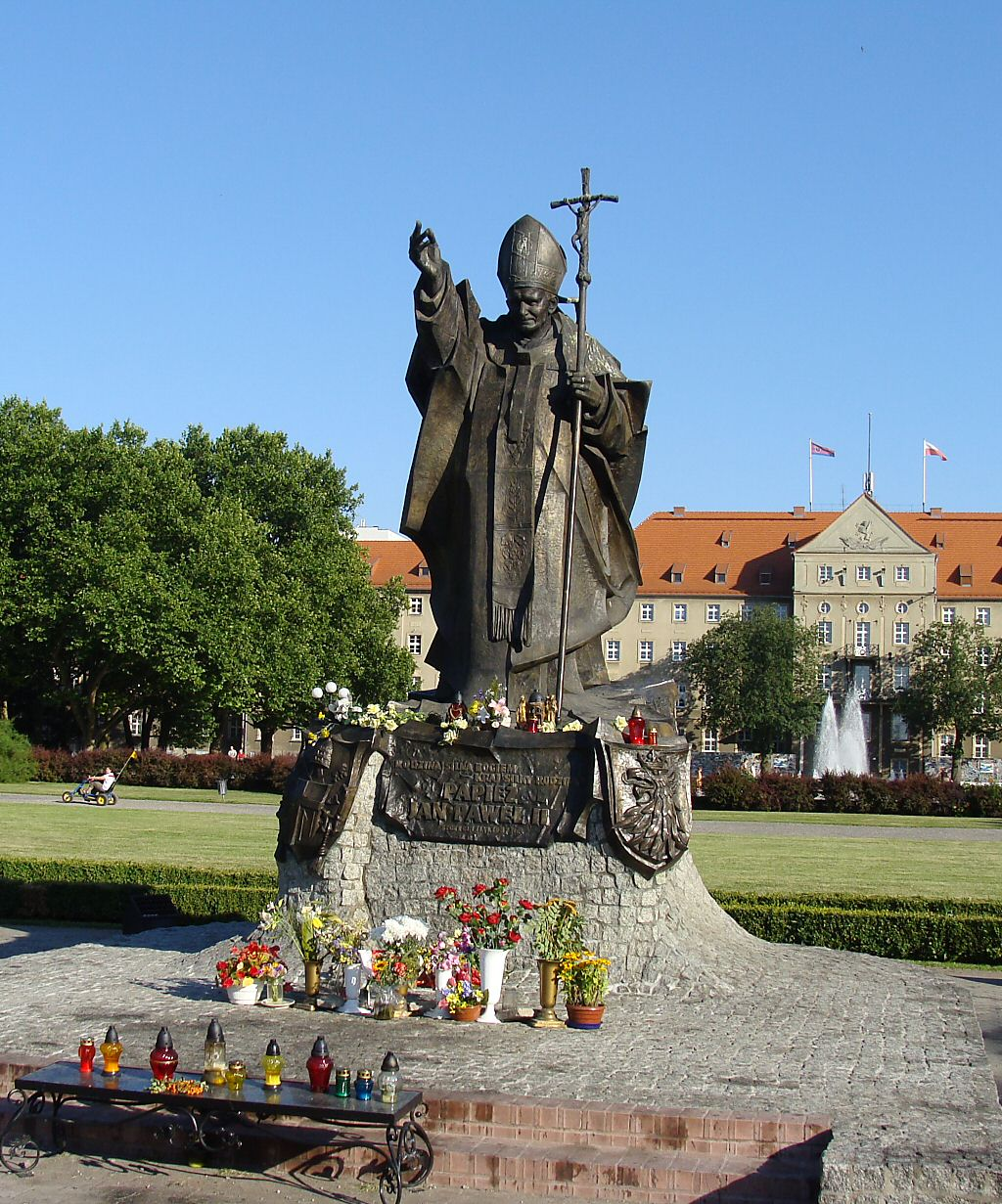
The statue of Pope John Paul II.

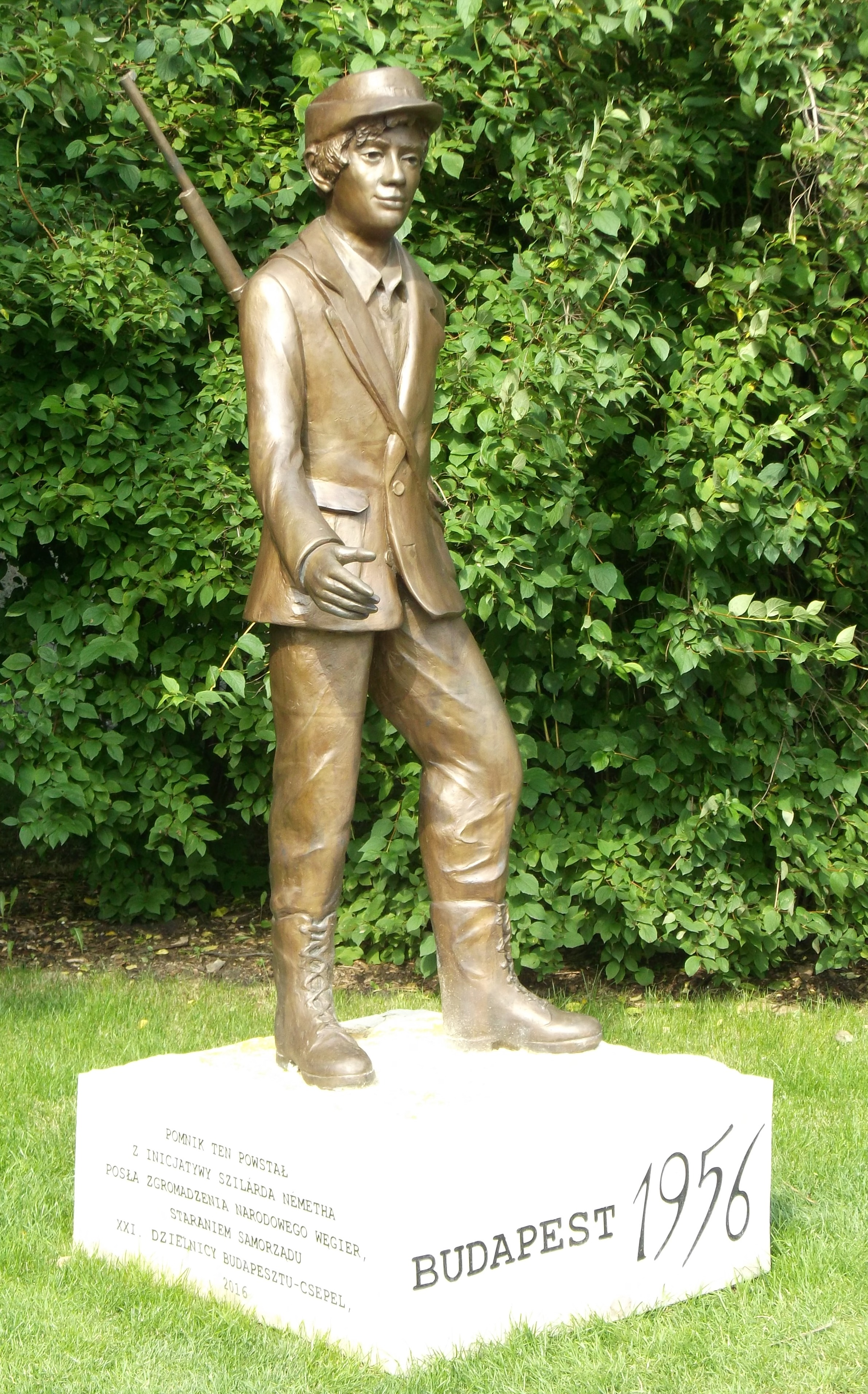
The statue of the Hungarian Boy.

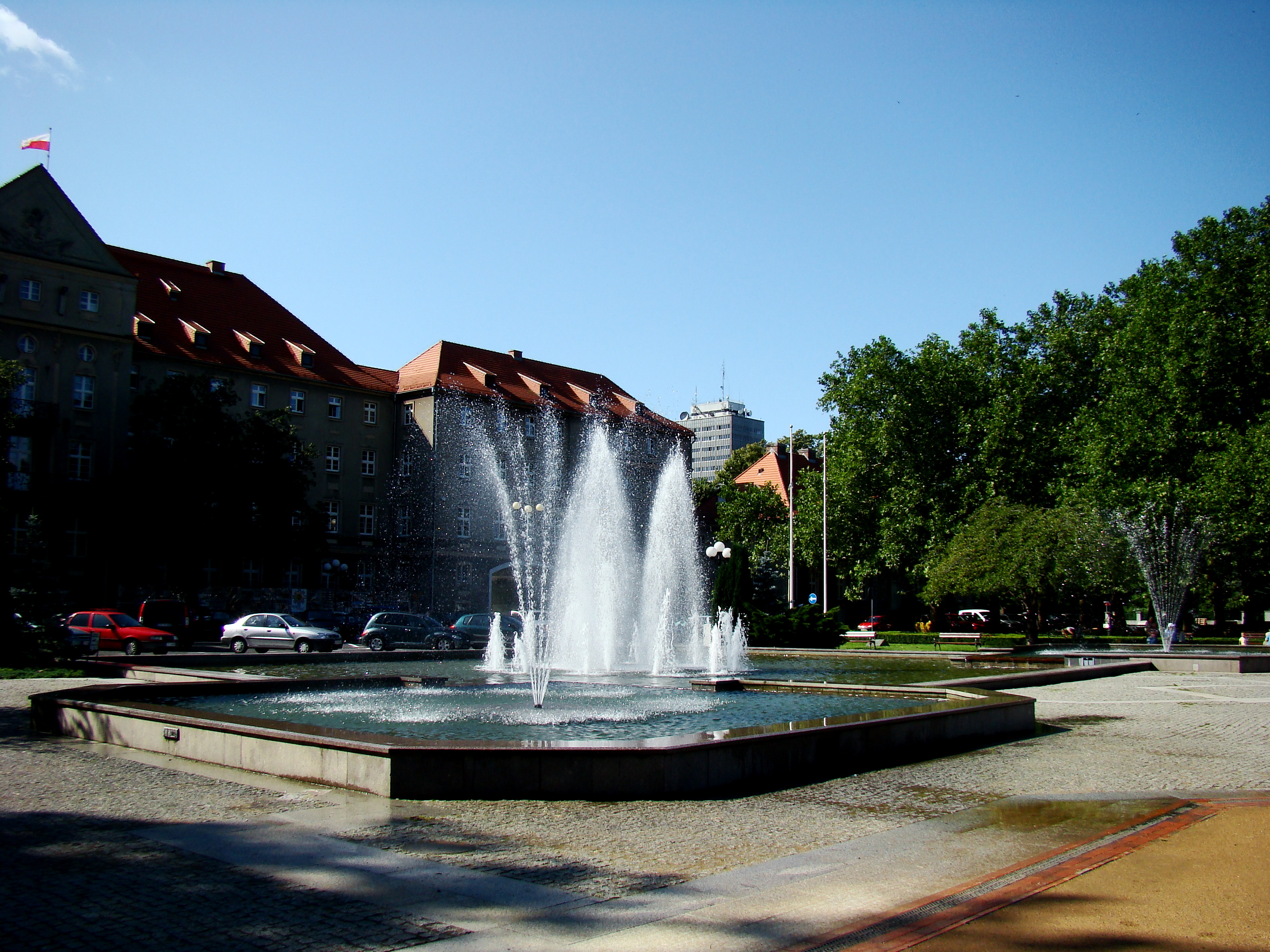
The fountain in the garden square.

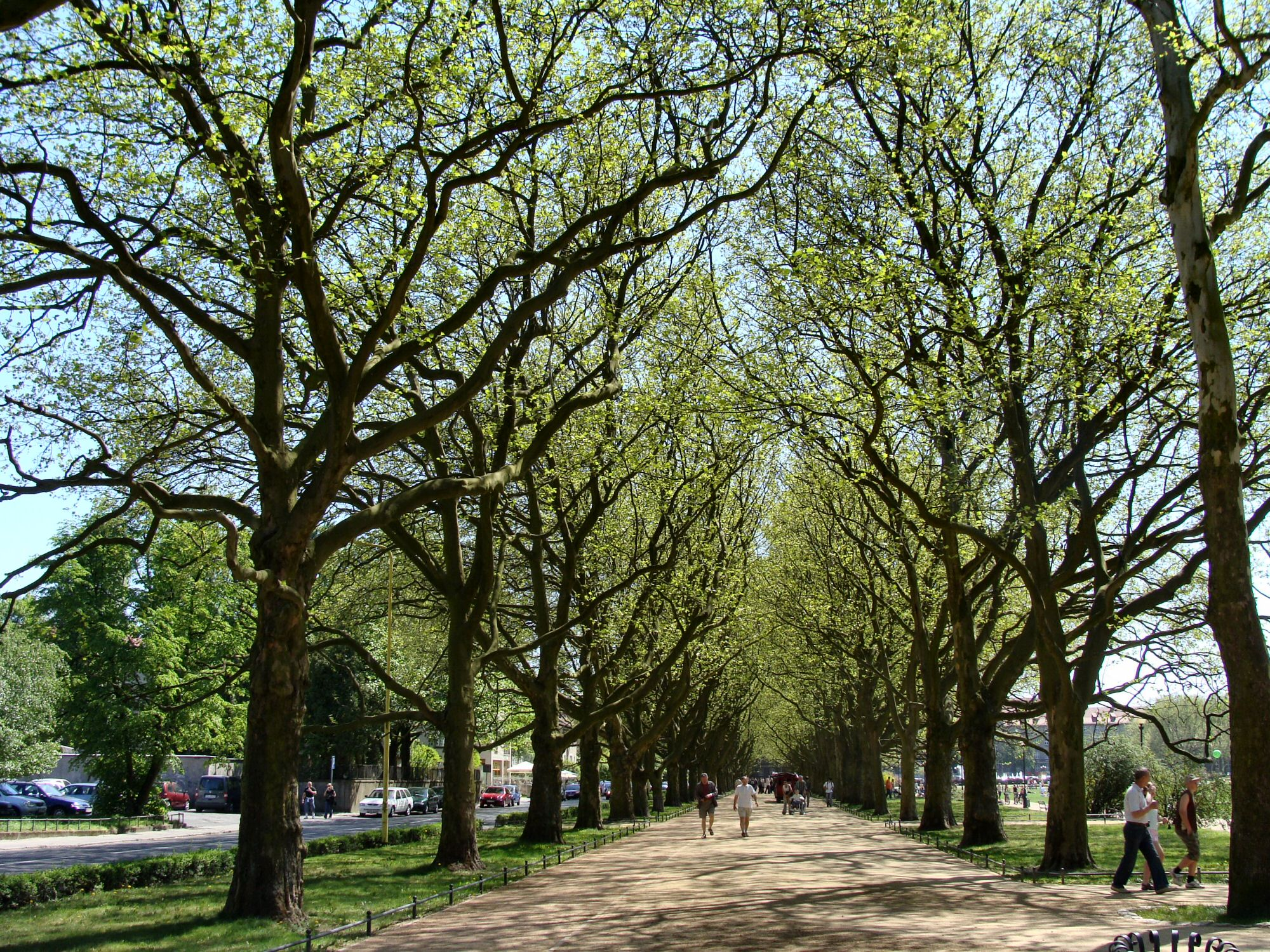
The avenue with the London plane trees.

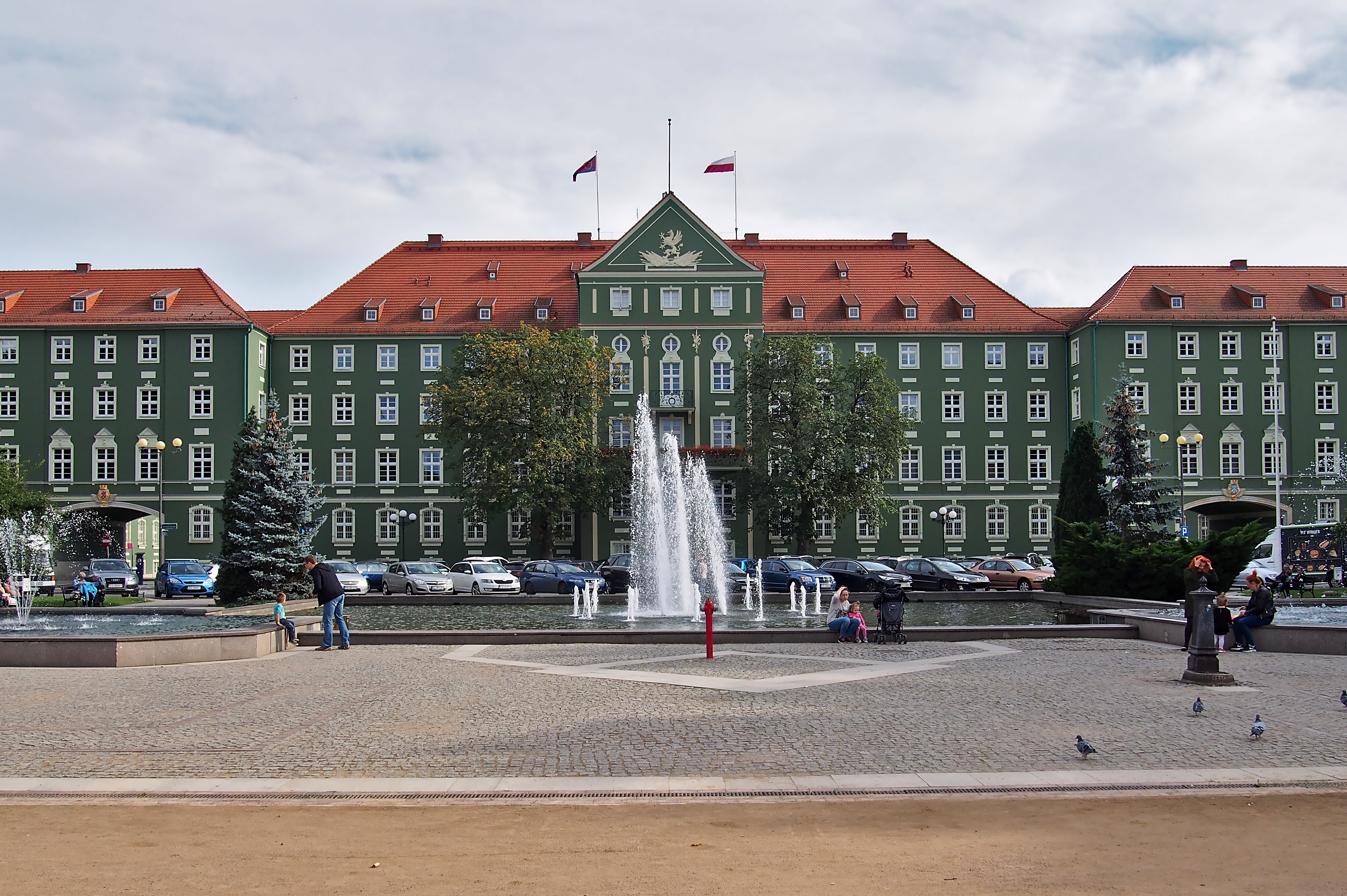
The Szczecin City Hall as seen from the Bright Meadows.
