= Statue of the Hungarian Boy =

2016 bronze sculpture in Szczecin, Poland

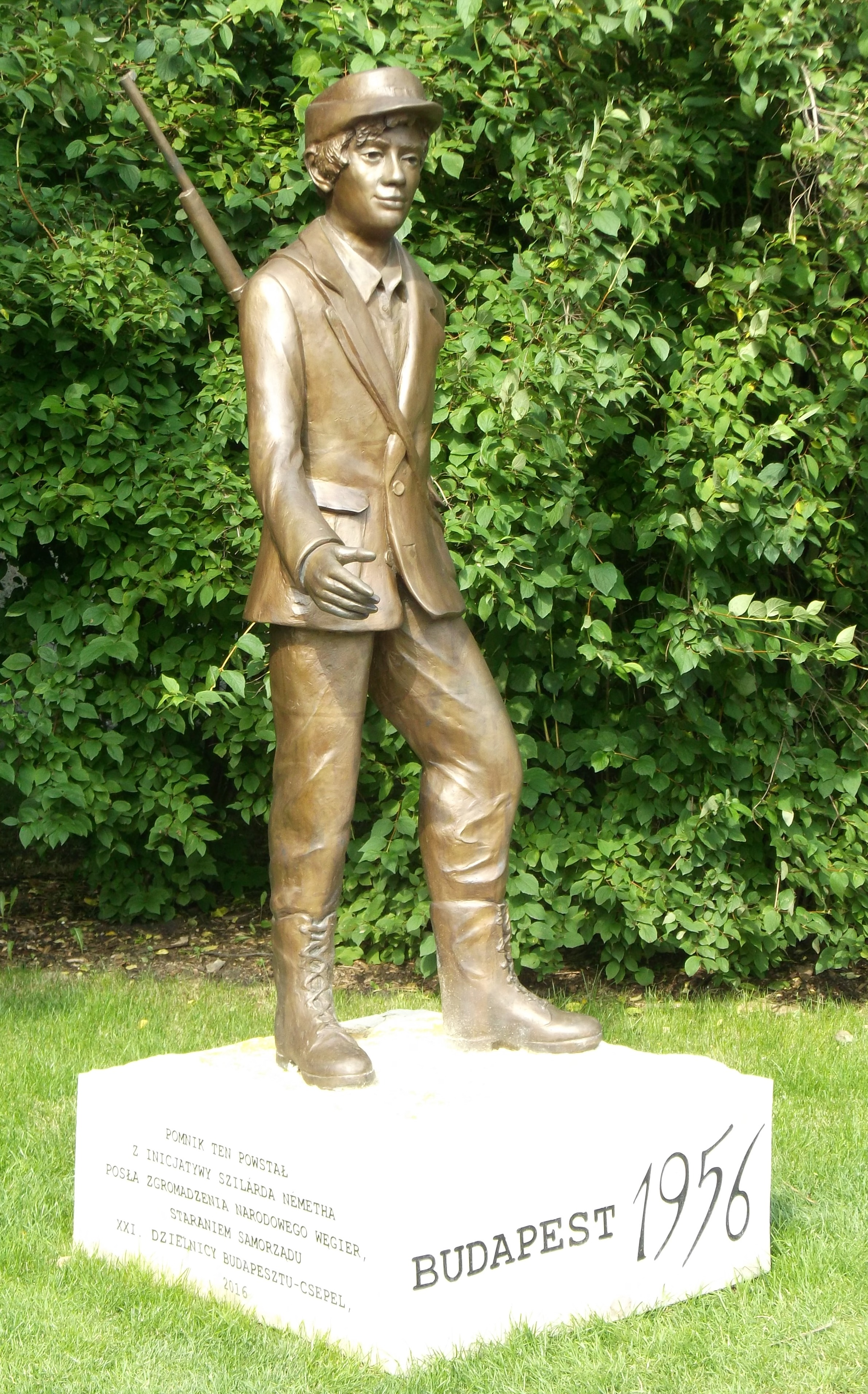
- The statue in 2016.
- Interactive map of Statue of the Hungarian Boy
- Location: Bright Meadows Square, Szczecin, Poland
- Coordinates: 53°26′31″N 14°32′21″E
- Designer: Richárd Juha
- Type: Statue
- Material: Bronze
- Height: 1.75 m (5 ft 9 in)
- Opening date: 9 December 2016

The statue of the Hungarian Boy (Polish: Pomnik Chłopca Węgierskiego), also known as the statue of the Boy from Pest (Hungarian: A Pesti srác szobra; Polish: Pomnik Chłopca z Pesztu), is a bronze statue by Richárd Juha in Szczecin, Poland, located at the Bright Meadows Square, next to Skarga Street, within the Downtown-North neighbourhood. It depicts a 17-year-old boy with a rifle, and commemorates the aid of Szczecin inhabitants to Budapest population during the Hungarian Revolution of 1956. The statue was unveiled on 9 December 2016.

== History ==
The statue was designed by Richárd Juha. It was proposed Szilárd Németh, a member of the National Assembly of Hungary, as a acknowledgment of the aid of the inhabitants of Szczecin, Poland to the population of Budapest, Hungary during the Hungarian Revolution of 1956, and financed by the council of Csepel, a district of Budapest. It was unveiled in Szczecin on 9 December 2016. Prior to this, an identical statue was unveiled in Budapest, on 23 October 2016, for the 60th anniversary of the revolution. Another statue by Richárd Juha, depicting the same person, but with different pose, holding a flag of Hungary, was also unveiled on 17 October 2016 in Washington, D.C., United States.

== Characteristics ==
The bronze statue depicts a 17-year-old boy wearing a suit and a cap, with a rifle worn on his back. He is reaching with his right hand for a handshake. The statue have the height of 1.75 m.
