= John Fraser (architect) =

American architect

- Born: October 18, 1825
- Died: December 26, 1906 (aged 81)
- Occupation: Architect

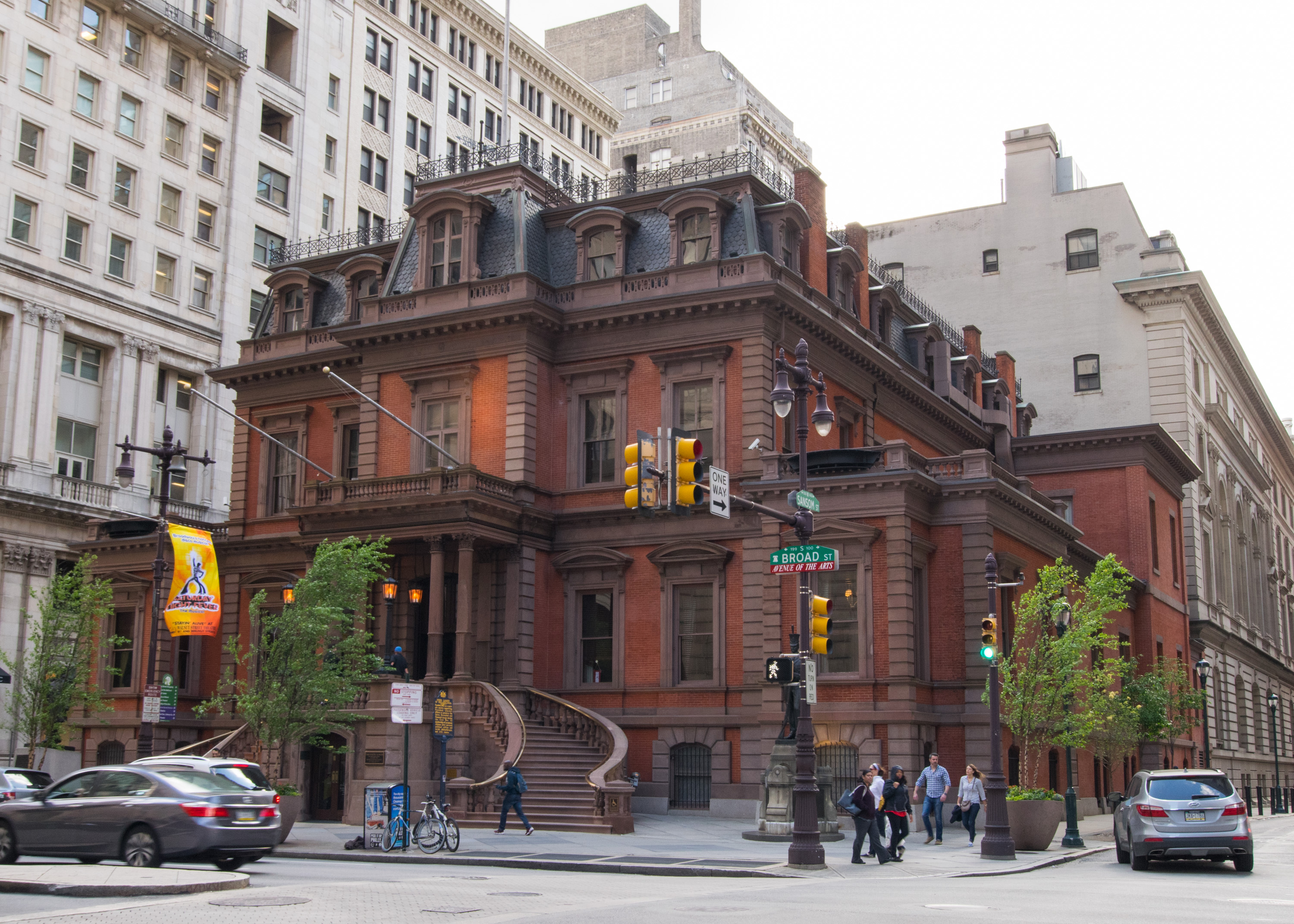
Union League of Philadelphia (1862-65).

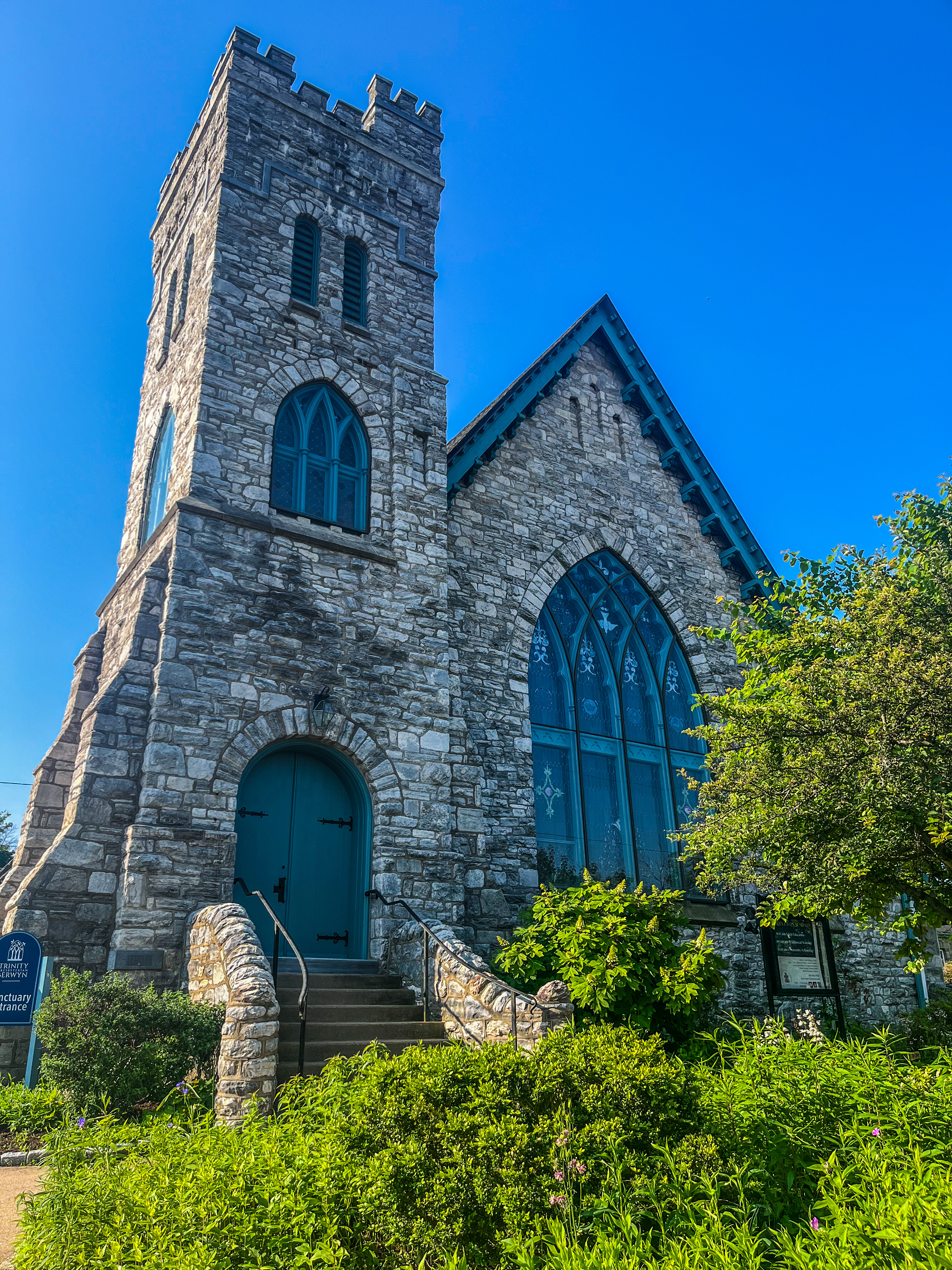
Trinity Presbyterian Church, Berwyn, PA. (1891)

John Fraser (October 18, 1825 – December 26, 1906) was a Scottish-born American architect who practiced in Philadelphia, Pennsylvania and Washington, D.C.

His most significant surviving building is the Union League of Philadelphia (1864–65), a High Victorian, Second Empire gentlemen's club constructed of brick and brownstone.

His career is overshadowed by that of his former student and one-time partner, Frank Furness (Fraser, Furness & Hewitt: 1867-71), whose influence is visible in Fraser's Washington, D.C. mansions for James G. Blaine and John T. Brodhead.

He served as acting supervisory architect for the U.S. Treasury (December 1878 - May 1879), created a master plan for the U.S. Capitol grounds, submitted among others a design for the Washington Monument and served later on the commission to complete Robert Mills's project of the Washington Monument.

He was one of the founders of the Philadelphia chapter of the American Institute of Architects.

He maintained a residence in Riverton, New Jersey, and designed a number of buildings there. By 1888, he had entered into a partnership with his son Archibald, and continued working until about 1902.

== Notable buildings ==
- Union League of Philadelphia, 140 South Broad Street, Philadelphia, Pennsylvania (1864–65).
- Joseph Bates House, 18th & Delancey Streets, Philadelphia, Pennsylvania (1867–68), with Frank Furness and George Hewitt.
- Manufacturers' National Bank, 27 North 3rd Street, Philadelphia, Pennsylvania (1870), with Frank Furness and George Hewitt.
- British Legation, Washington DC, D.C. (1872, demolished 1931)
- General Plan for the Extension of the U.S. Capitol Grounds, Washington, D.C. (1874)
- Calvary Presbyterian Church, Riverton, New Jersey (1878–79)
- Brodhead-Bell-Morton Mansion, 1500 Rhode Island Ave. NW, Washington, D.C. (1879)
- James G. Blaine Mansion, 2000 Massachusetts Ave. NW, Washington, D.C. (1881).
- Christ Episcopal Church, Riverton, New Jersey (1884)
- Alhambra Theatre, Dunfermline, Fife, Scotland (1922)
- Trinity Presbyterian Church, Berwyn, Pennsylvania (1891)
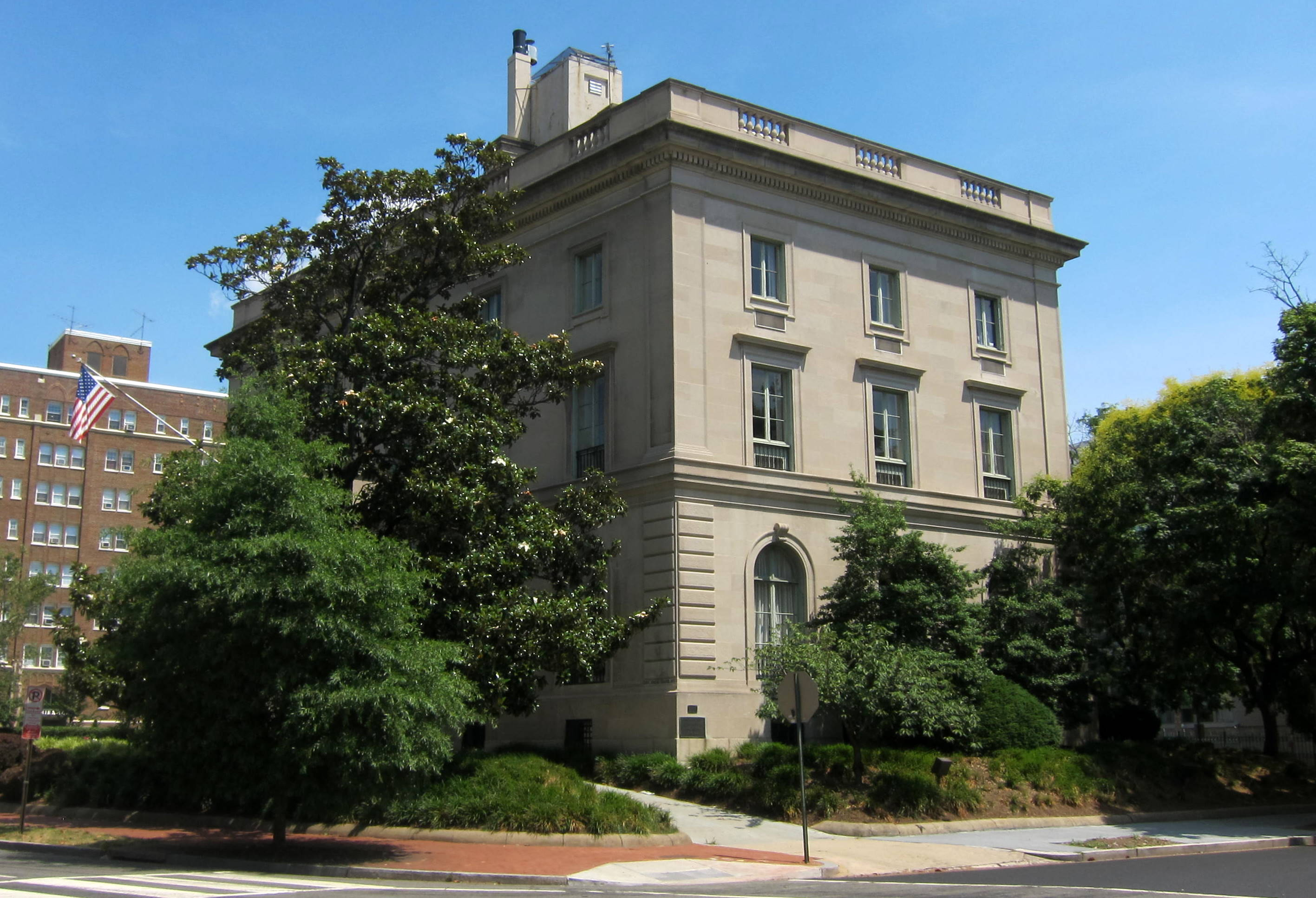
Brodhead-Bell-Morton Mansion, Washington, D.C. (1879).

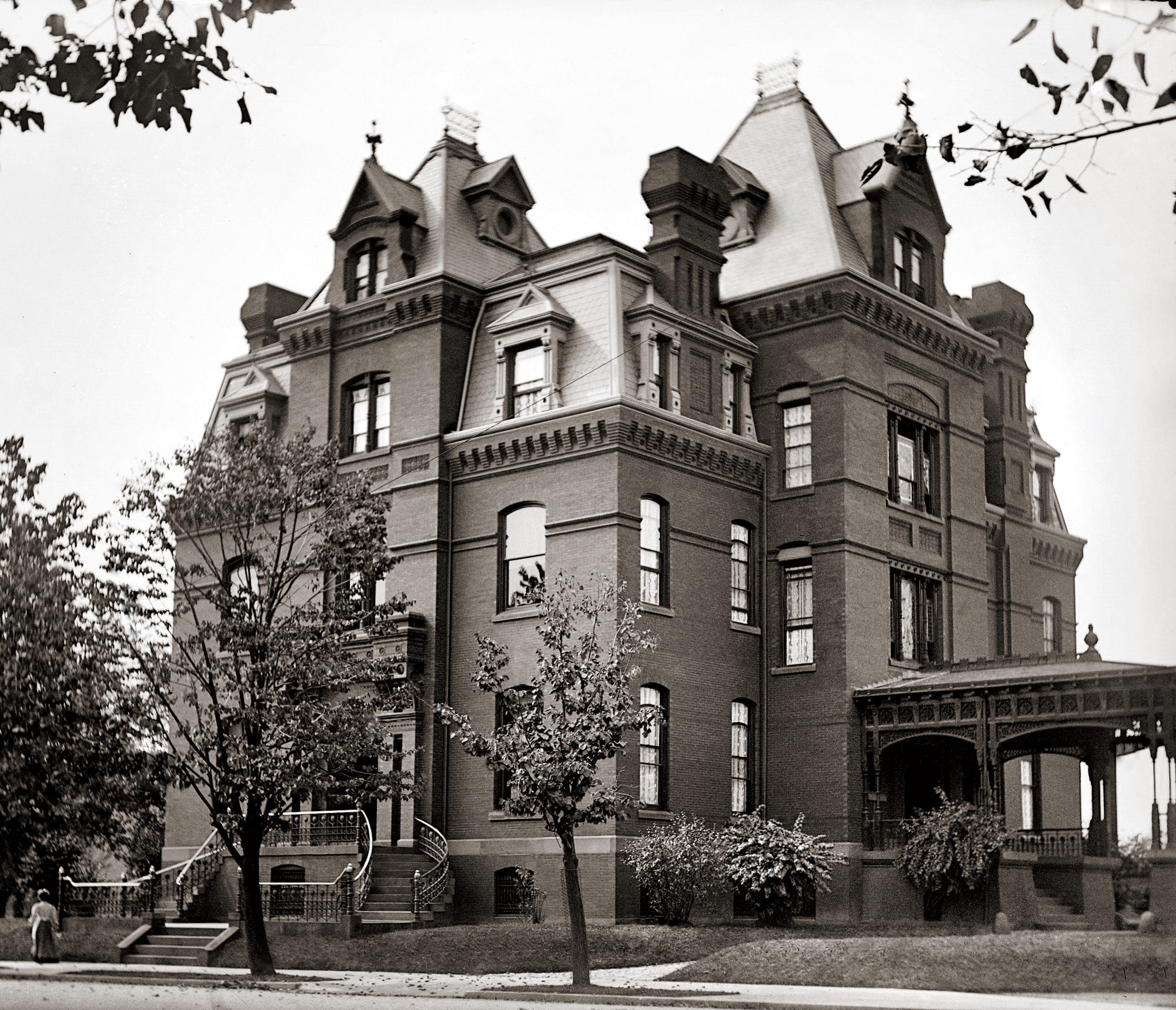
James G. Blaine Mansion, Washington, D.C. (1881).
