= Brodhead-Bell-Morton Mansion =

Historic house in Washington, D.C., United States

- U.S. National Register of Historic Places
- D.C. Inventory of Historic Sites
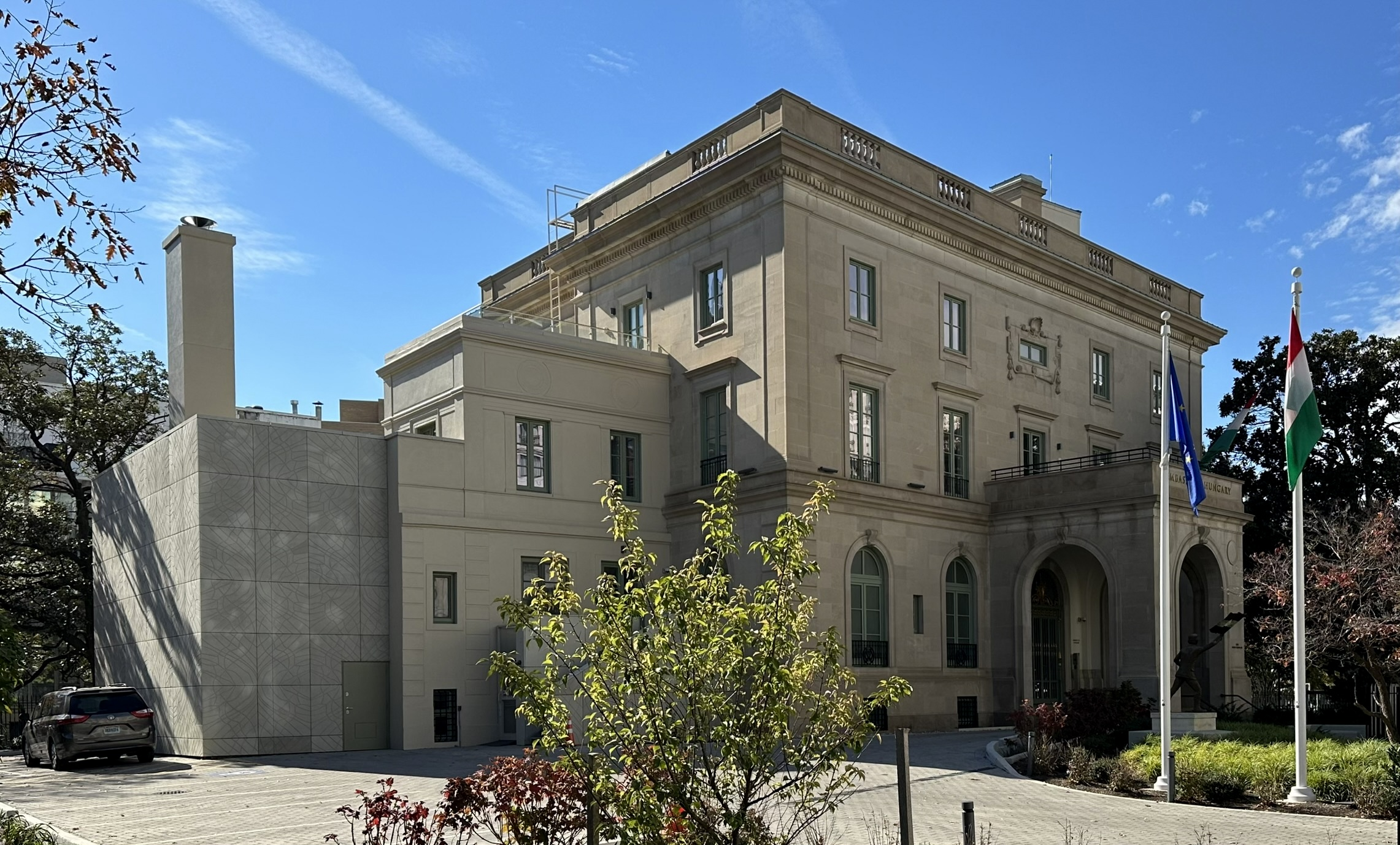
- Brodhead-Bell-Morton Mansion in 2023 housing the Embassy of Hungary

- Location within Central Washington, D.C.
- Location: 1500 Rhode Island Avenue, NW; Washington, D.C.
- Coordinates: 38°54′27.87″N 77°2′6.18″W
- Built: 1879
- Architect: John Fraser; John Russell Pope
- Architectural style: Beaux-Arts
- NRHP reference No.: 87001769

Significant dates
- Added to NRHP: October 14, 1987
- Designated DCIHS: November 8, 1964

The Brodhead-Bell-Morton Mansion, also known as the Levi P. Morton House is a historic Beaux-Arts home, located at 1500 Rhode Island Avenue, Northwest, Washington, D.C., in the Logan Circle neighborhood.

== History ==
It was built in 1879, to the designs of architect John Fraser, and comprehensively remodeled in 1912 by architect John Russell Pope.

The Beaux-Arts style building originally served as the private residence of John. T. Brodhead, and Jessie Willis Brodhead. Between 1939 and 2016, the building served as offices for the National Paint, Varnish, and Lacquer Association (now known as the American Coatings Association). Former occupants include Alexander Graham Bell and his wife Mabel Gardiner Hubbard, U.S. Vice President Levi P. Morton, the Embassy of Russia, and U.S. Secretary of State Elihu Root.

The building is listed on the National Register of Historic Places, and the District of Columbia Inventory of Historic Sites.

In February 2016 the Mansion was purchased from American Coatings Association by Hungary to move the Embassy of Hungary there later in the year.

On October 17, 2016, in front of the building was unveiled the statue of the Boy from Pest by Richárd Juha.

== See also ==
- National Register of Historic Places listings in Washington, D.C.
