= Embassy of Hungary, Washington, D.C. =

Diplomatic mission to the United States

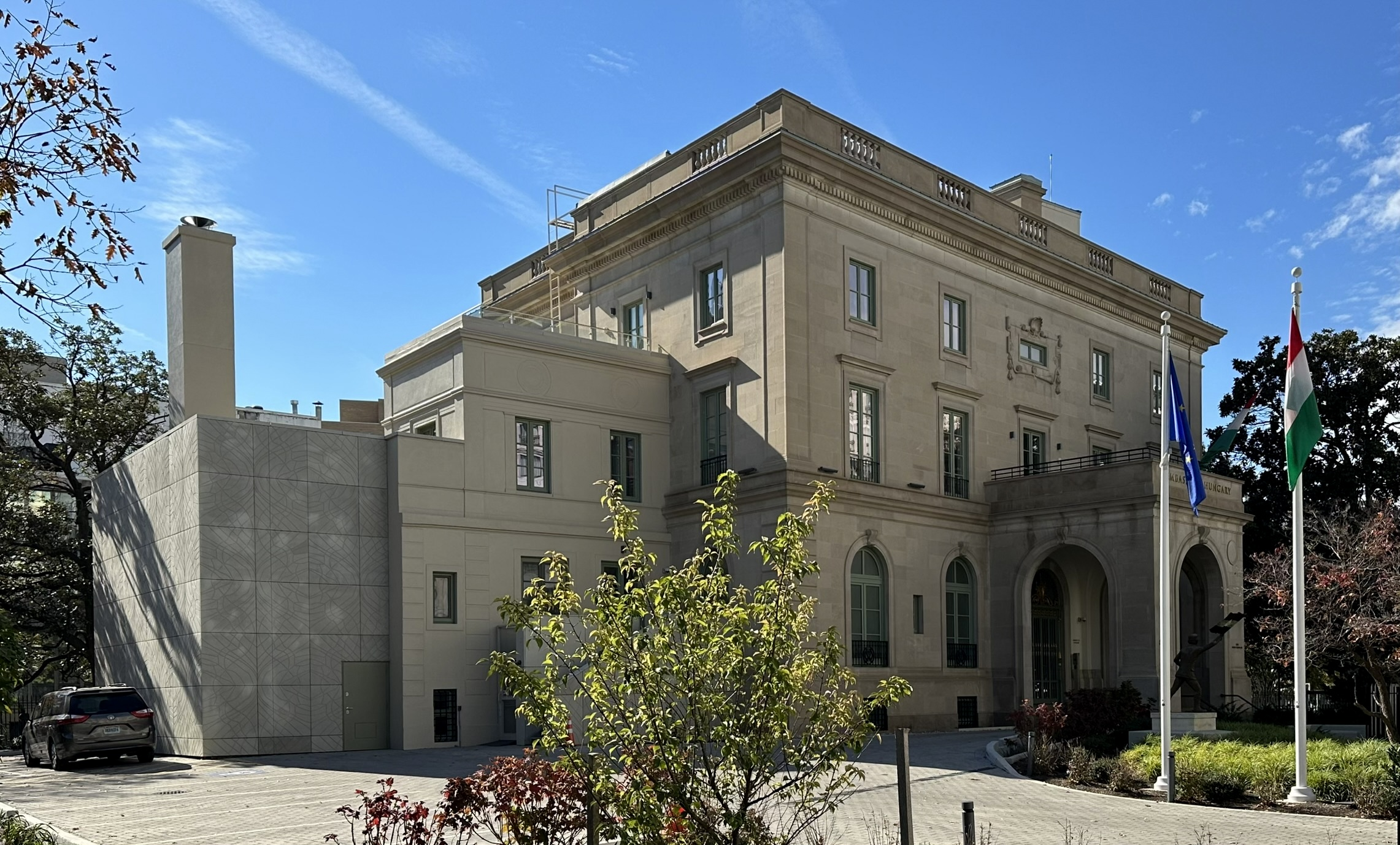
- Embassy of Hungary in 2023
- Location: Washington, D.C.
- Address: 1500 Rhode Island Avenue, N.W.
- Coordinates: 38°56′24″N 77°3′11″W
- Ambassador: Szabolcs Ferenc Takács
- Website: Official website

The Embassy of Hungary in Washington, D.C. is Hungary's diplomatic mission to the United States. It is located at the Brodhead-Bell-Morton Mansion. Consular and administrative offices are still located at 3910 Shoemaker Street, Northwest, Washington, D.C., in the Cleveland Park neighborhood. The 3910 Shoemaker Street location of the Embassy of Hungary in Washington, D.C. still hosts several events, like the EU Open House. Hungary also has consulate offices in Chicago, New York City and Los Angeles.

In 2004 the Hungarian government paid $3 million for the former house of John Edwards at 2215 30th Street, N.W. to house then-ambassador András Simonyi.

The Ambassador is Szabolcs Ferenc Takács. Previously it was László Szabó.

== See also ==
- Hungary – United States relations
- List of diplomatic missions in Washington, D.C.
