= Monument to the Polish Endeavour =

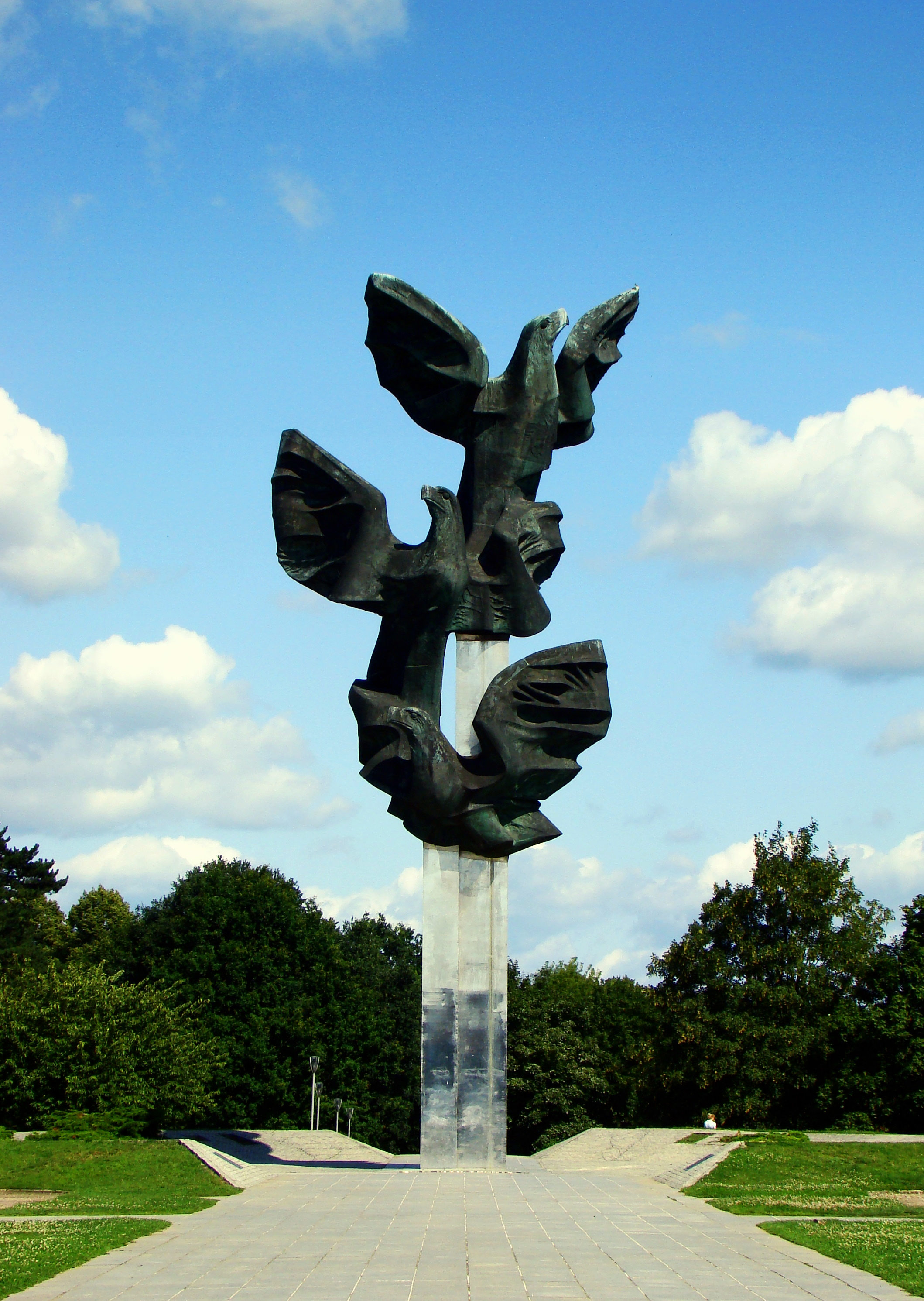
- The Monument to Polish Endeavour in 2009.
- Interactive map of Monument to the Polish Endeavour
- Location: Bright Meadows Square, Szczecin, Poland
- Coordinates: 53°26′34.00″N 14°32′15.69″E
- Designer: Gustaw Zemła
- Type: Statue
- Material: Bronze, steel
- Height: 22.5 m (74 ft)
- Completion date: 3 September 1979
- Dedicated to: Population of Szczecin

The Monument to the Polish Endeavour (Polish: Pomnik Czynu Polaków), also known as the Three Eagles Monument (Polish: Pomnik Trzech Orłów), and the Eagles' Nest (Polish: Gniazdo Orłów), is a monument in the city of Szczecin, Poland, located at the Bright Meadows Square, at the boundary with the Jan Kasprowicz Park. It was designed by Gustaw Zemła, and unveiled in 1979.

The monument consists of three bronze sculptures of eagles with spread wings, each placed on a steel column with a square base. The three birds are meant to symbolize three generations of Polish inhabitants of the city. That includes the Polish people who lived in the city prior to the end of the Second World War in 1945, people who moved to, and rebuilt the city after the end of the conflict, in place of mostly German population, who left or were deported, and the children of the new population, who further developed the city.

== Name ==
The monument is officially known as the Monument to the Polish Endeavour (Polish: Pomnik Czynu Polaków). Its author, Gustaw Zemła, titled it Eagles' Nest (Polish: Gniazdo Orłów). The sculpture, which is the main element of the monument, is known as the Three Eagles (Polish: Trzy Orły), and as such, the monument is also sometimes colloquially known as the Three Eagles Monument (Polish: Pomnik Trzech Orłów).

== History ==
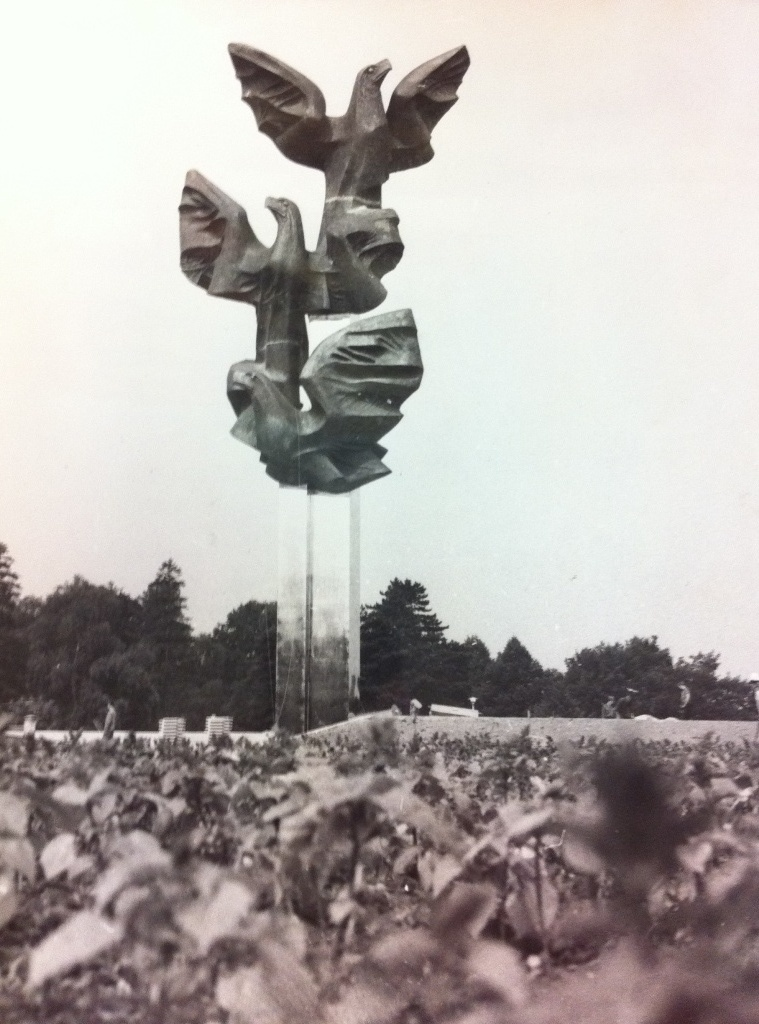
The Monument to the Polish Endeavour in 1979.

On 6 September 1972, the Szczecin Voivodeship Committee of the Polish United Workers' Party decided to build a monument in Szczecin, Poland. It was proposed by Janusz Brych, the general secretary of the voivodeship committee. The monument was meant to be a sign of respect and gratitude for the inhabitants of the city of Szczecin, for their efforts in rebuilding and expanding the city since the end of the Second World War. The efforts of the monument construction were taken on by the Friends of Szczecin Society (Polish: Towarzystwo Przyjaciół Szczecina), which was led by Jan Stopyra, the mayor of Szczecin. The monument was originally meant to be unveiled for the 30th anniversary of the end of the Second World War, however, due to delays and prolonged discussions, it was ultimately decided to unveil it on the 35th anniversary instead. On 29 December 1976, was established the Organization of Monument Construction Committee, with Jan Stopyra as its leader. It was decided that the monument would be built at the Bright Meadows Square, at the boundary with the Jan Kasprowicz Park.

The monument was designed by Gustaw Zemła, in cooperation with Eugeniusz Kozak. The steel pedestal of the monument was designed by Jerzy Piskorz-Nałęcki, in cooperation with Jerzy Podesławski and Edward Pianko. The construction of the monument was overseen by Kazimierz Szulc. It was decided to name it the Monument to the Polish Endeavour (Polish: Pomnik Czynu Polaków), though Zemła titled it the Eagles' Nest (Polish: Gniazdo Orłów). The monument would consist of the bronze sculpture of three eagles, placed on the steel pedestal. The three birds were meant to symbolize three generations of Polish inhabitants of the city. That included the Polish people who lived in the city prior to the end of the Second World War in 1945, people who moved to, and rebuilt the city after the end of the conflict, in place of mostly German population, who left or were deported, and the children of the new population, who further developed the city.

The bronze sculptures of the moment were manufactured in Marcel Nowotka Mechanical Factories (now PZL-Wola) in Warsaw, and the metal steel pedestal of the monument, in the Szczecin Shipyard. The sculptures were transported from Warsaw with barges of the Żegluga Szczecińska (Szczecin Shipping), by the Vistula river to the sea port in Gdańsk, and from there to the port in Świnoujście via the Baltic Sea, and then to the port in Szczecin, via the Szczecin Lagoon and the Oder river. The transportation was overseen by the deputy mayor of Szczecin, Zdzisław Pacała.

The monument was unveiled on 3 September 1979, near the 40th anniversary of the beginning of the Second World War, which would be on 1 September which was Saturday. The monument was unveiled by Stanisław Kowalczyk, Minister of Interior. At the same time, the Council of State of the Republic of Poland awarded the city with the First Class Order of the Banner of Labour, in recognition of its population's contribution to the development of the country.

== Design ==
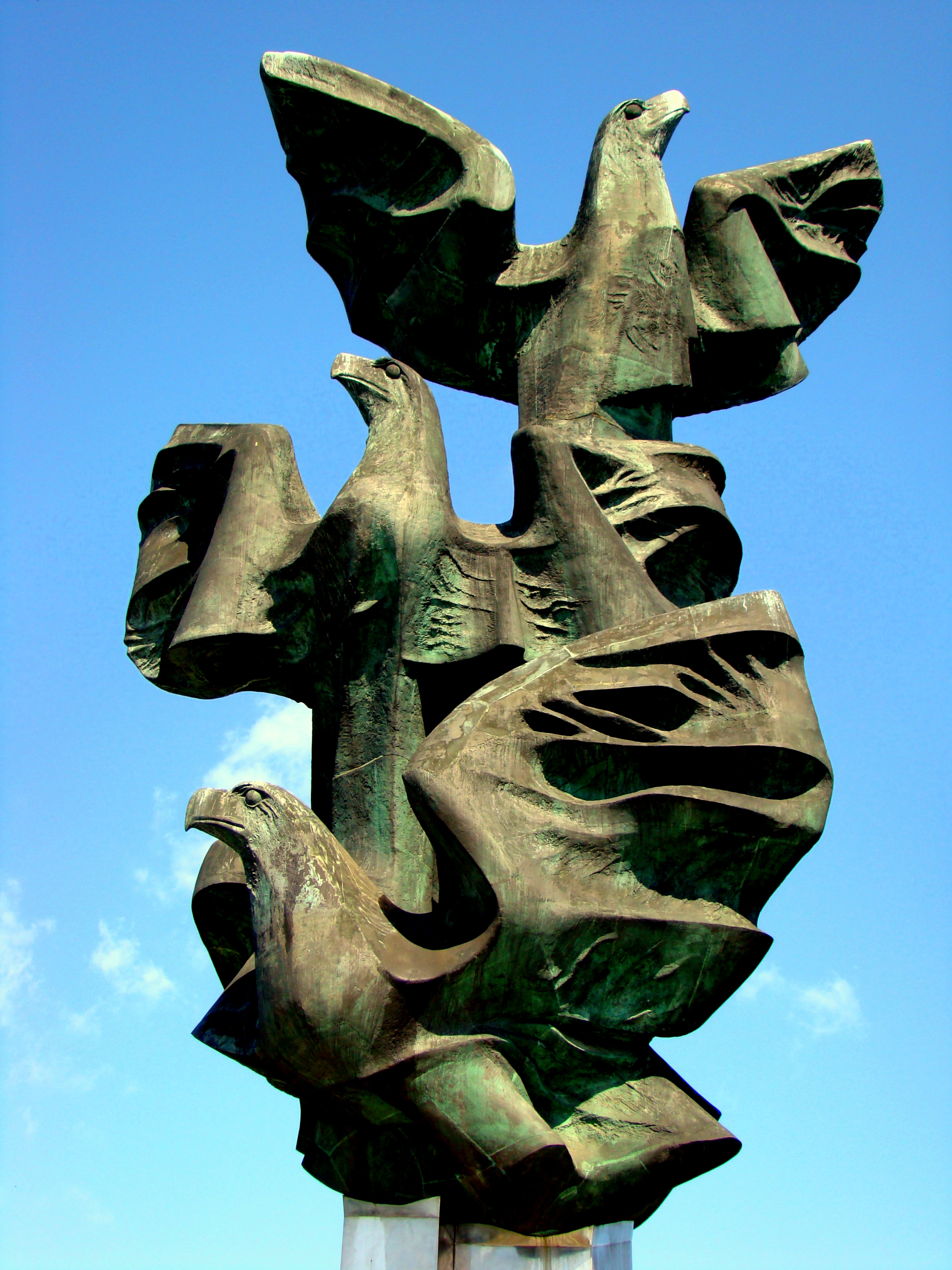
The sculptures of the Three Eagles, the main element of the monument.

The monument is located in the city of Szczecin, Poland, located at the Bright Meadows Square, at the boundary with the Jan Kasprowicz Park. It consists of three bronze sculptures of eagles with spread wings, each placed on a steel column with a square base. The three birds are meant to symbolize three generations of Polish inhabitants of the city. That includes the Polish people who lived in the city prior to the end of the Second World War in 1945, people who moved to, and rebuilt the city after the end of the conflict, in place of mostly German population, who left or were deported, and the children of the new population, who further developed the city.

The monument has a total height of 22.5 m (73.82 ft.). The lowest eagle is placed 7.7 m (25.26 ft.) from the ground, and each eagle has a wingspan of 6.5 m (21.33 ft.), and together they weigh 60 tonnes. The columns are embedded 4 m (13.12 ft.) deep into the ground and in the 150-tonne concrete block. The outer layer of the columns is covered in the stainless steel. In total, the columns weigh 83 tonnes, of which 10 tons are the stainless steel. Underground, below the monument is located a room from which can be accessed two ladders hidden within the columns, which lead to the inside of the eagle sculptures, which can be accessed by conservators.

Around the monument are placed plaques with the names of the people involved in its creation.
