= Giffin =

Giffin is a surname. Notable people with the surname include:

- D. Logan Giffin (1890–1980), American lawyer and politician
- David Giffin (born 1973), Australian rugby player
- Emily Giffin (born 1972), American author
- Etta Josselyn Giffin (1863–1932), American librarian
- Fred Giffin (1920–1999), Australian weightlifter
- Gordon Giffin (born 1949), American diplomat
- Lee Giffin (born 1967), American ice hockey player
- Merritt Giffin (1887–1911), American athlete
- Michael Giffin (born 1984), Canadian football player
- Roger Giffin, English luthier
- Ron Giffin (1942–2021), Canadian lawyer and politician
- Simon Osborn Giffin (1870–1935), Canadian merchant and politician

== See also ==
- Giffin House, a historic house in New Hampshire, US
