= Gunmetal =

Alloy of copper, tin, and zinc

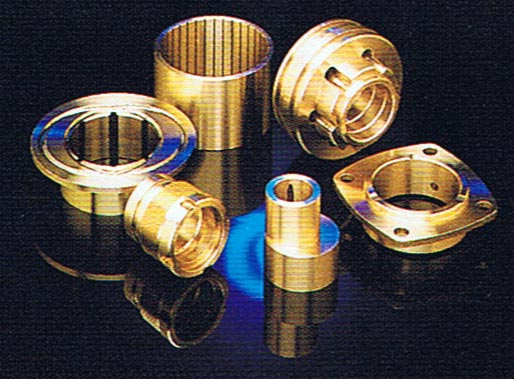
Gunmetal parts

Gunmetal, also known as red brass in the United States, is a type of bronze – an alloy of copper, tin, and zinc. Proportions vary, but 88% copper, 8–10% tin, and 2–4% zinc is an approximation. Originally used mainly for making guns (the historic term for cannons, mortars, howitzers, etc.), it has largely been replaced by steel for that purpose. Handheld firearms such as muskets and pistols were historically mostly made of cast iron, and then steel, while cannons and similar mounted firearms were made of bronze until at least the mid-19th century.
Gunmetal casts and machines well, and is resistant to corrosion from steam and salt water. It is used to make steam and hydraulic castings, valves, gears, statues, and various small objects, such as buttons. It has a tensile strength of 221 megapascals (32,100 psi) to 310 megapascals (45,000 psi), a specific gravity of 8.7, a Brinell hardness of 65 to 74, and a melting point of around 1,000 degrees Celsius.

== Variants ==
- Gunmetal ingot is a related alloy in which the zinc is replaced by 2% lead. This makes the alloy easier to cast, but it has less strength.
- Modified gunmetal contains lead in addition to zinc. It is typically composed of 86% copper, 9.5% tin, 2.5% lead, and 2% zinc. It is used for gears and bearings.
- U.S. government bronze specification G C90500 is composed of 88% copper, 10% tin, and 2% zinc, as is British Admiralty gunmetal.
- G bronze (or Copper Alloy No. C90300) contains 88% copper, 8% tin, and 4% zinc.
- U.S. government bronze specification H is composed of 83% copper, 14% tin, 3% zinc, and 0.8% phosphorus.
- Red brass is used to produce pipes, valves, and plumbing fixtures and is considered to offer a good mixture of corrosion-resistance, strength and ease of casting. It typically contains 85% copper, 5% tin, 5% lead, and 5% zinc.
- Copper Alloy C23000, which is also known as red brass, contains 84–86% copper, 0.05% each iron and lead, with the balance being zinc.

Gunmetal can also mean steel treated to simulate gunmetal bronze. Bushings made of this metal are used in machinery.

== Other uses of gunmetal ==
Gun money, Irish late 17th-century emergency coins, contain gunmetal, as worn and scrapped guns were used to make them, but also many other metals, in particular brass and bronze, because people donated pots and pans and various metal objects.

External doors and windows of offshore rock lighthouses are often made of gunmetal due to its corrosion-resistant properties.
