= Ludwik Waryński Memorial =

Monument in Warsaw, Poland

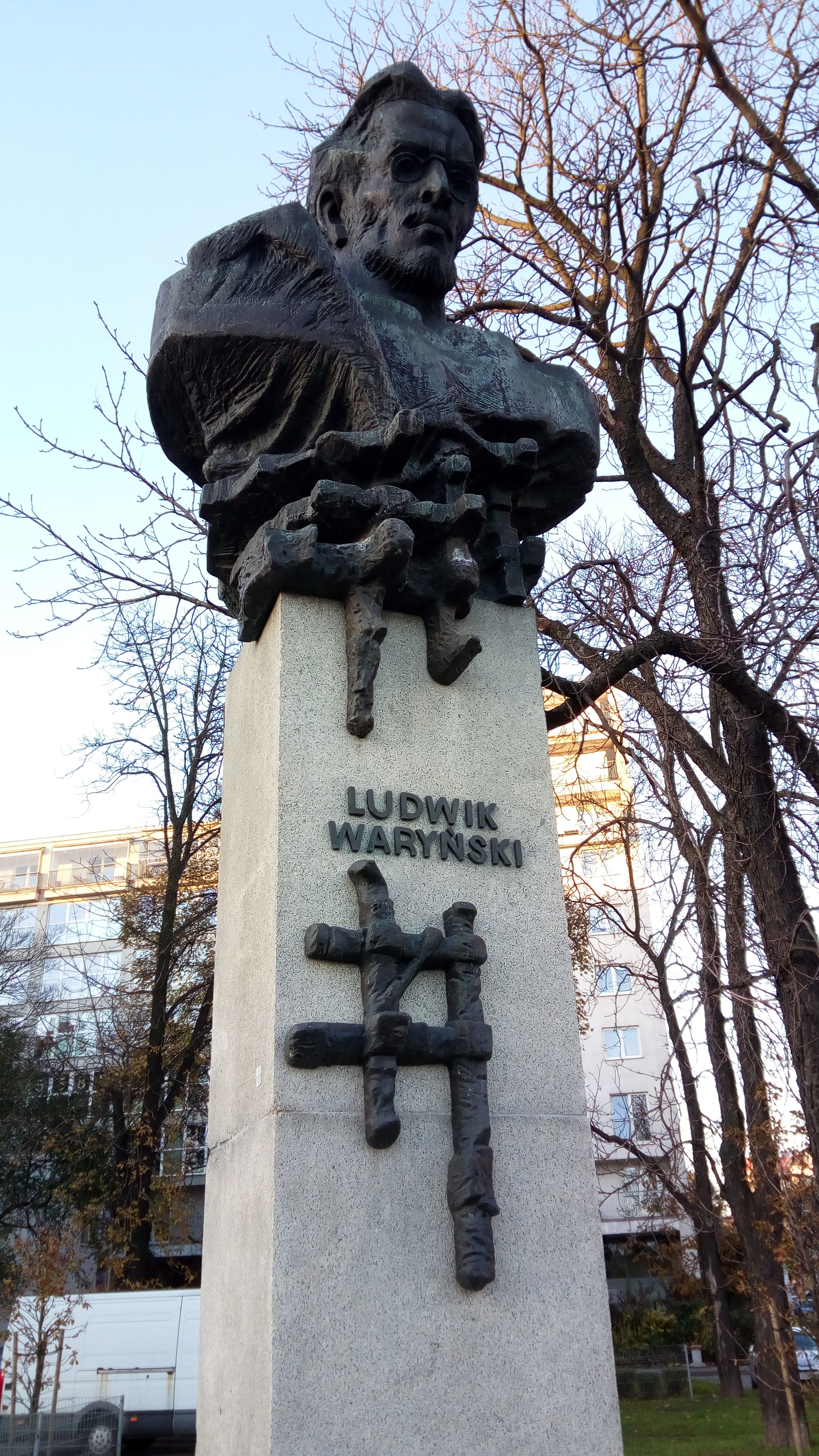
- The sculpture in 2017.
- Interactive map of Ludwik Waryński Memorial
- Location: Bema Street, Wola, Warsaw, Poland
- Coordinates: 52°13′42.5″N 20°57′32.6″E
- Designer: Gustaw Zemła
- Type: Bust
- Material: Bronze (bust); granite (pedestal)
- Opening date: 27 July 1974 (original unveiling); 10 December 2013 (unveiling at the current location)
- Dedicated to: Ludwik Waryński
- Dismantled date: 2006

The Ludwik Waryński Memorial (Polish: Pomnik Ludwika Waryńskiego) is a bronze bust sculpture on a granite pedestal, located in Warsaw, Poland, at the corner of Bema and Kasprzaka Streets, within the neighbourhood of Czyste, in the district of Wola. It is dedicated to Ludwik Waryński, a 19th-century activist and theoretician of the socialist movement in Poland. The sculpture was designed by Gustaw Zemła, and originally unveiled on 27 July 1974 at 57 Kolejowa Street. It was removed in 2006, and reinstalled at its current location in 2013.

== History ==
The monument was designed by Gustaw Zemła, and unveiled on 27 July 1974, at the courtyard of the Ludwik Waryński Constitution Machinery Factories at 57 Kolejowa Street.

In 2006, after the area was acquired by Spain-based company Pro Urba, it was decided to develop there a residence neighbourhood, which would constituted the removal of the sculpture. As such, the leftwing organizations in the city have founded the Community for the Defence of the Ludwik Waryński Monument, protesting its removal. On 24 September, in front of the sculpture, the committee had organised a large celebration of the 150th anniversary of Waryński's birth, attended by politicians from the Democratic Left Alliance and Labour Union. Despite this, the monument was removed and placed in the warehouses of company Bumar-Waryński.

Politicians of the Democratic Left Alliance undertook efforts for its return. However, this idea was opposed by members of the Law and Justice party. The monument was eventually returned and unveiled on 10 December 2013, at the corner of Bema and Kasprzaków Streets.
