= Yanasinqa =

Mountain in Peru

- Location within Peru

Highest point
- Elevation: 5,400 m (17,700 ft)
- Coordinates: 11°34′28″S 76°10′19″W

Geography
- Location: Peru, Junín Region
- Parent range: Andes

Yanasinqa (Quechua yana black, sinqa nose, "black nose", Hispanicized spelling Yanashinga, Yanasinga) or Yanashinqa (in the local Quechua variant) is a mountain in the Andes of Peru, about 5,400 metres (17,717 ft) high. It is situated in the Junín Region, Yauli Province, Morococha District. Yanasinqa lies north of a lake named Waqraqucha and northeast of the peak of Antikuna and the Antikuna mountain pass.

The Yanasinqa glacier is one of those which have been observed regularly during a period of 24 years (1944-1968).
