= Statue of Henryk Sienkiewicz =

Monument in Warsaw, Poland

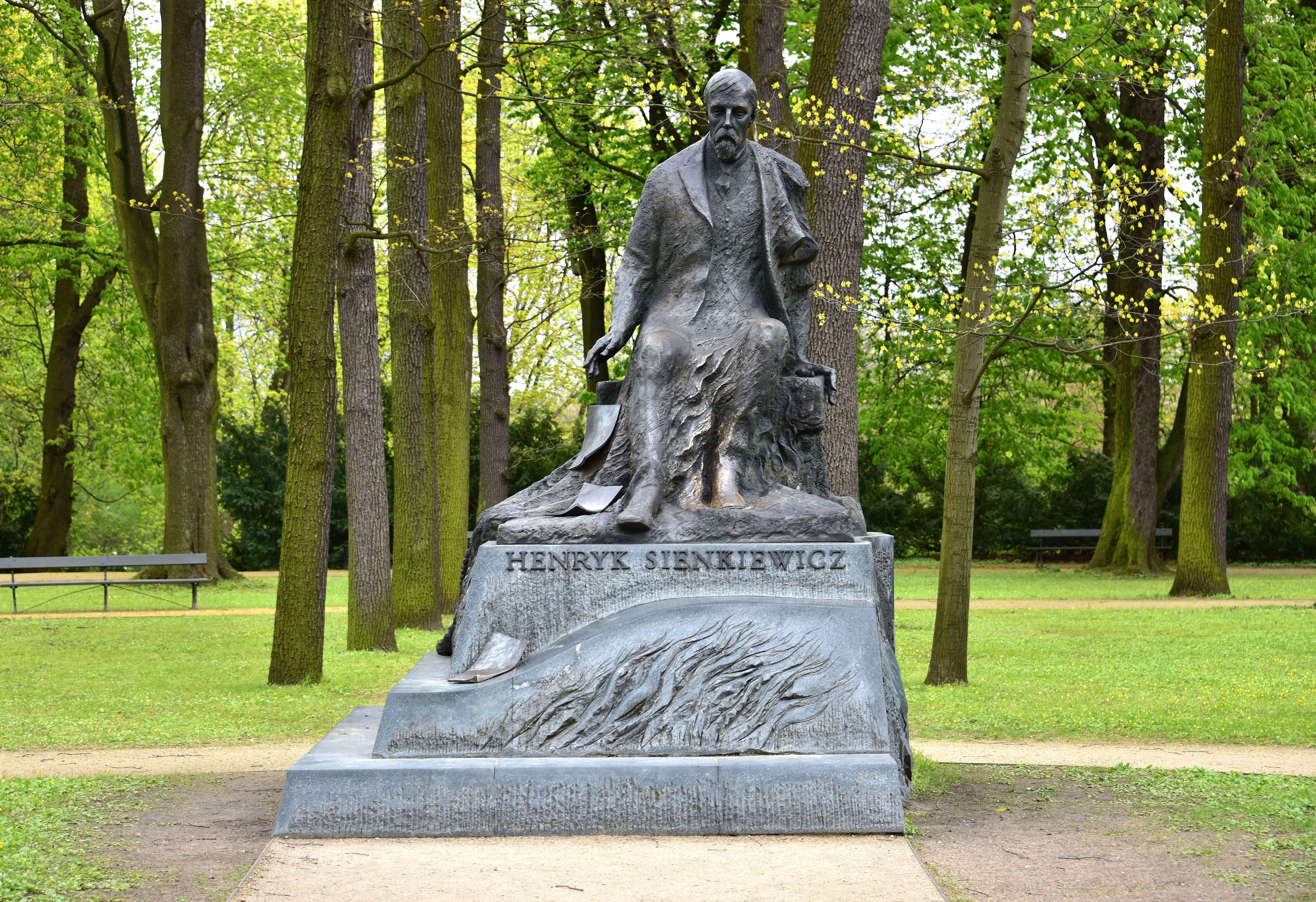
- The monument in 2017.
- Interactive map of Statue of Henryk Sienkiewicz
- Location: Royal Baths Park, Downtown, Warsaw, Poland
- Coordinates: 52°12′56.25″N 21°01′37.28″E
- Designer: Gustaw Zemła
- Type: Statue
- Material: Bronze (statue); syenite (pedestal)
- Beginning date: 11 June 1998
- Opening date: 5 May 2000
- Dedicated to: Henryk Sienkiewicz

The statue of Henryk Sienkiewicz (Polish: Pomnik Henryka Sienkiewicza) is a sculpture in Warsaw, Poland, within the neighbourhood of Ujazdów in the Downtown district, in the western part of the Royal Baths Park. It has a form of a bronze statue of Henryk Sienkiewicz, a 19th- and 20th century novel writer, placed on a syenite pedestal. The sculpture was designed by Gustaw Zemła and unveiled on 5 May 2000.

== History ==
The monument was dedicated to Henryk Sienkiewicz, a 19th- and 20th century novel writer. It was originally proposed soon after his death in 1916, and a committee responsible for its construction was founded in 1937. It was planned to be erected at the Małachowski Square, however it was cancelled due to the outbreak of the Second World War in 1939.

The construction of the monument was financed in 1997 by art collectors Zbigniew Karol Porczyński and Janina Porczyńska, who donated 100,000 United States dollars. In accordance to their wishes, it was designed by Gustaw Zemła. The statue was cast in bronze in Tadeusz Zwoliński's metal workshops in Iłża. The cornerstone was placed on 11 June 1998.

The monument was unveiled on 5 May 2000, in the Royal Baths Park in Warsaw, by Maria Sienkiewicz and Jan Sienkiewicz, respectively, a granddaughter and a great-grandson of Henryk Sienkiewicz.

== Characteristics ==
The monument is placed in the western portion of the Royal Baths Park, near Ujazdów Avenues. It is located within the neighbourhood of Ujazdów in the Downtown district. It consists of a bronze statue of Henryk Sienkiewicz, depicted wearing a suit and longcoat, in a sitting position, and dropping three pages from his manuscript. It is placed on a pedestal, made from syenite which originated from the Lower Silesian Voivodeship. At front it features a relief depicting flames. They symbolise the history of Poland, the subject of The Trilogy, one of Sienkiewicz's most well known works. On the right side is a relief of the coat of arms of the Polish–Lithuanian Commonwealth, with a shield in the centre of the escutcheon depicting Mary, mother of Jesus.
