= Ernest Malinowski =

Polish civil engineer (1818–1899)

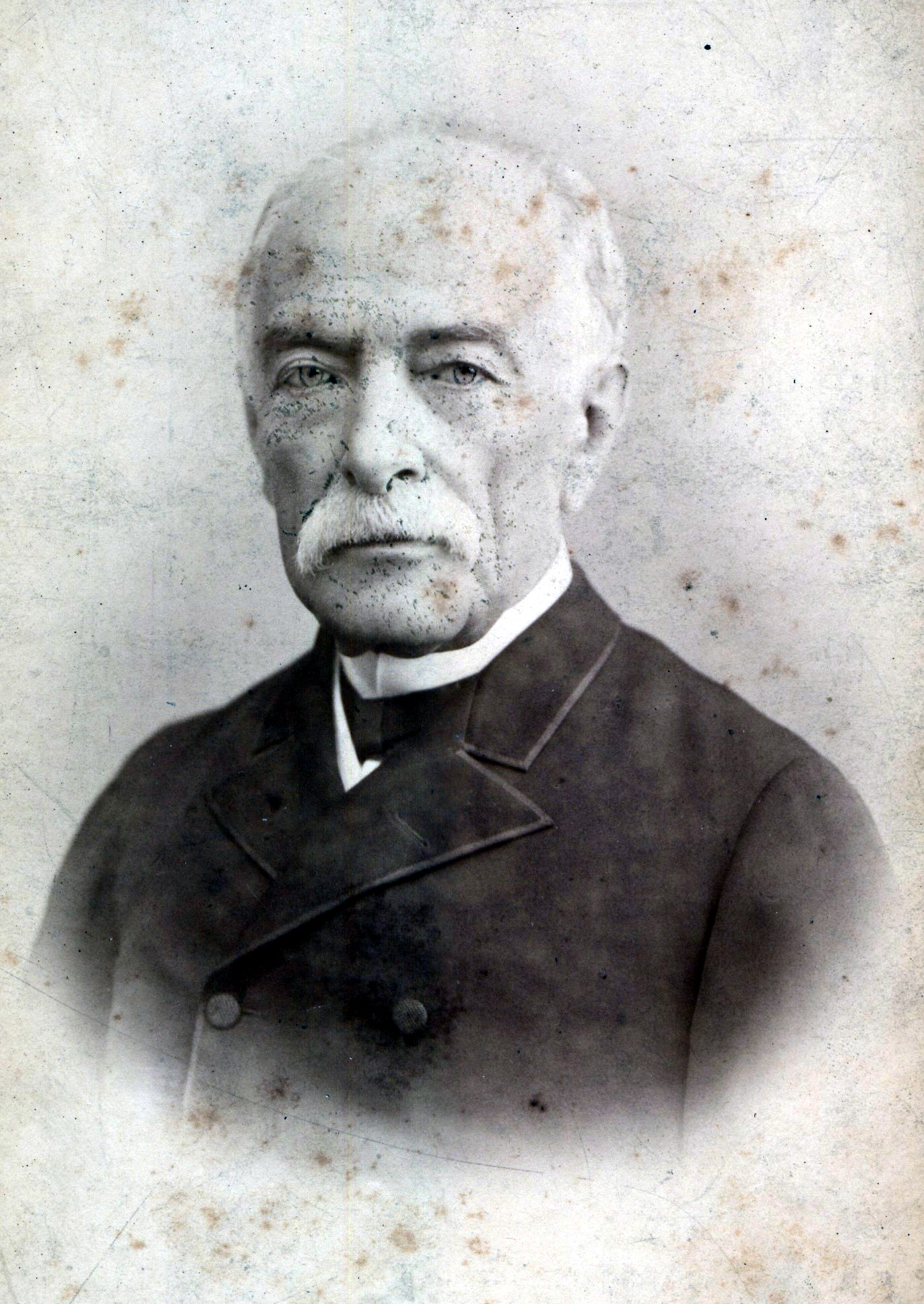
- Ernest Malinowski ca. 1890
- Born: 5 January 1818; Seweryny, Russian Empire (present-day Ukraine)
- Died: 2 March 1899 (aged 81); Lima, Peru
- Education: Lycée Louis-le-Grand; École Polytechnique; École des ponts ParisTech
- Parents: Jakub Malinowski; Anna Świejkowska
- Engineering career
- Discipline: Civil engineer
- Institutions: Comisión Central de Ingenieros Civiles
- Projects: Ferrovias Central

Adam Stanisław Hipolit Ernest Nepomucen Malinowski (5 January 1818 – 2 March 1899; Spanish: Adam Estanislao Hipólito Ernesto Nepomuceno Malinowski) was a Polish civil engineer best known for constructing the world's highest railway at the time, the Ferrovias Central, in the Peruvian Andes between 1871–1876 . He participated in the Battle of Callao in 1866 and was also a corresponding member of the Polish Museum in Rapperswil Society in Switzerland.

== Early life ==
He was born in 1818 in the village of Seweryny, near Zviahel to Jakub Malinowski, an officer serving in the army of the Duchy of Warsaw and Anna Świejkowska, daughter of Voivode of Podolia Leonard Świejkowski. Between 1827 and 1831 he attended the Volhynian High School in Kremenets. In 1832, he emigrated to France where he studied at the Lycée Louis-le-Grand and later École Polytechnique (1834–1836). Between 1838 and 1839, he worked on the construction of the Paris–Le Havre railway line. In 1839, he was sent to Algeria where he was involved in the construction of roads in the Bône Province. He then moved to Algiers where he participated in the construction of the city's port. In 1840, he returned to France and worked on regulating the Meuse River until 1847. He was also involved in the political activities of Polish exiles in France and collaborated with Hôtel Lambert founded by Prince Adam Czartoryski.

== Move to Peru ==
In 1852, he signed a six-year contract to work as a government engineer in Lima, Peru. Together with two French engineers (Emil Chevalier and Charles Fraguette), he set off on a journey to Peru, where he arrived on 30 December 1852. After arriving in the capital, he took part in the creation of a new technical organization, Comisión Central de Ingenieros Civiles, and the first Peruvian technical school, Escuela Central de Ingenieros Civiles. Difficulties in maintaining and expanding the school quickly arose and Ernest Malinowski withdrew from cooperation in the field of education. Then he implemented several minor construction and road projects. In 1856, he took part in the work of the commission evaluating the project of extension and modernization of Casa de Moneda in Lima, i.e. the state mint. In addition, he published a short study on monetary topics and developed the so-called gold etalon, i.e. the metal content in the coin. He designed (1858) and supervised the paving of streets and squares in Arequipa as part of the comprehensive reconstruction of the city after the war. He supervised the modernization works of the Izcuchaca stone bridge.

After returning to Lima at the end of 1858, he extended his contract with the Peruvian government for another three years. In 1859, together with Mario Alleon and Gerrit S. Backus, he designed the 74 km Pisco-Ica railway line, and in 1864, with Stephen Crosby and D. N. Paddison, he designed the Chimbote to Huaraz railway line, almost 277 km long, with a difference of over 3,000 km. meters. Ernest Malinowski supervised the construction of this line from 1869. Due to financial problems, the project was carried out only on a distance of 136 km. During the armed conflict with Spain in 1866, Ernest Malinowski was appointed chief engineer in the port of Callao near Lima, where, together with Felipe Aranciba and José Cornelio Borda, he prepared a project to fortify the port. He took part in the defense of the port, fighting on the ramparts of the Santa Rosa fort. In defense of the port, he applied many innovative engineering solutions. He had armored large-caliber guns from the surplus after the American Civil War and placed them on railway platforms so that they could easily change their position. This significantly increased the mobility of artillery and gave the opponent the impression that the defense had more guns than in reality. In recognition of his services, he received a diploma, a medal and honorary citizenship of Peru.

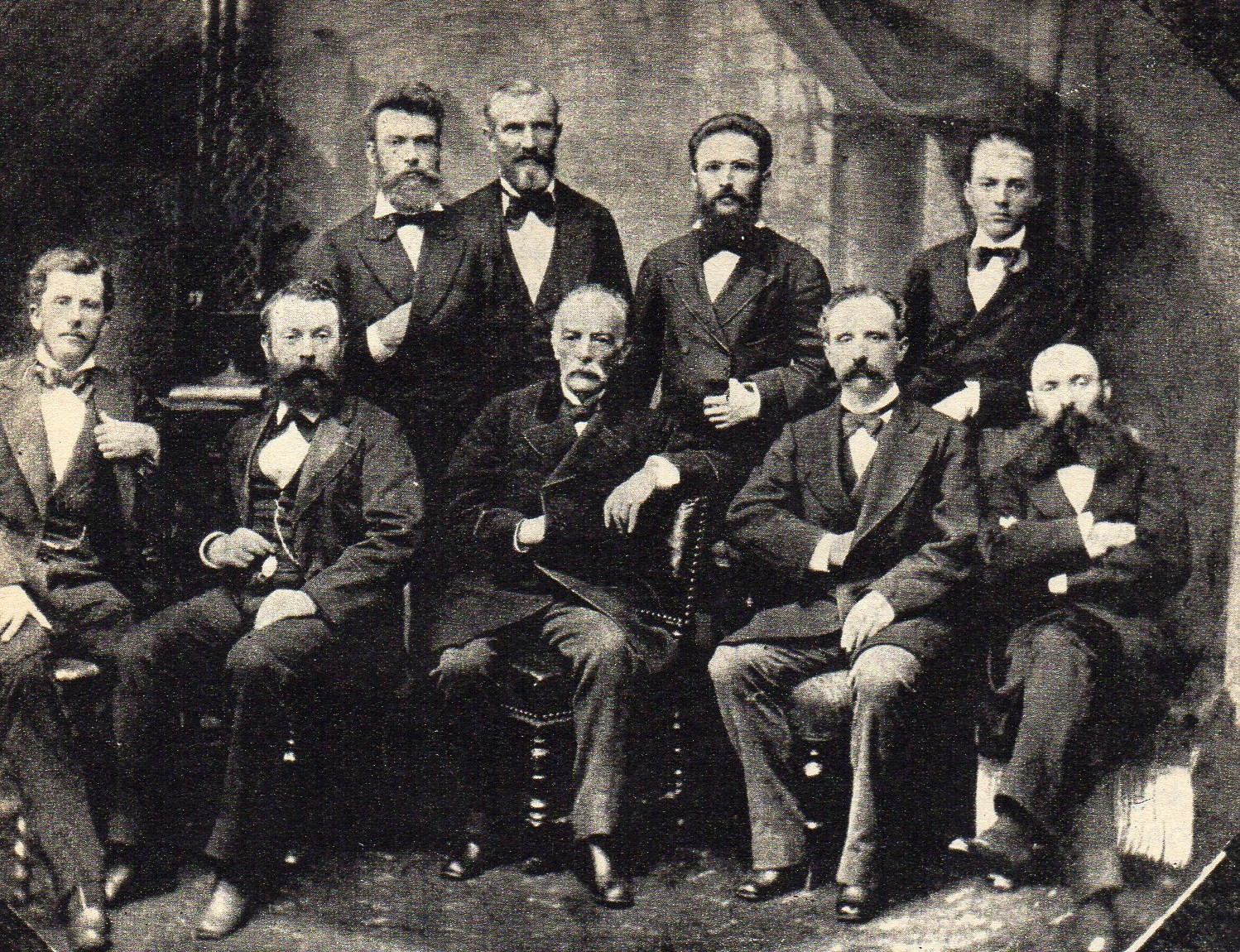
Ernest Malinowski (third from left in the bottom row) with a group of Polish engineers in Peru in 1874

Simon Bolivar already spoke about the road connection of the coast with the interior of Peru in 1825. In 1853, Congress passed the Road and Railway Building Act, and in 1859 issued a decree establishing a commission to investigate the possibility of building railroads by the Andes. Due to the need to implement other investments, the issue of the railway route was postponed. In 1868, Congress issued a new decree on the construction of the Lima-La Oroya railway line (the 10-kilometer section connecting Lima with the port of Callao had been in operation since 1851) and announced a tender to select the most advantageous offer from the financial and technical point of view. A few days after the announcement of Henry Meiggs' decree, the American entrepreneur obtained permission to conduct preliminary studies of the railway line. This work was entrusted to Ernest Malinowski, who selected his associates.

After eight months, on April 3, 1869, he handed over to Henry Meiggs a detailed report of the field studies carried out and a preliminary calculation of construction costs. The project involved connecting Lima with the mineral-rich Cerro de Pasco region and the fertile Jauja Valley. In the future, it was possible to extend the railway line along the Chanchamayo (Spanish) river valley towards the Amazon River behind the Andes, which would allow Peru to be connected to the Atlantic Ocean. The contract between the Meiggs company and the government for the construction of the Central Transandino (Central Transandino) was signed on December 23, 1869. In the first point of this contract, Ernest Malinowski was appointed the contractor for the works on the Lima - La Oroya section. The construction was to take six years, and the investment cost was estimated at 27,600,000 sols (approximately $22 million). The whole was to be financed by the Peruvian government, with Henry Meiggs to pay the engineers and workers from his own funds and to buy the land on the route of the railway under construction from private hands, the government undertook to transfer the state land and return the invested money with interest-bearing vouchers.

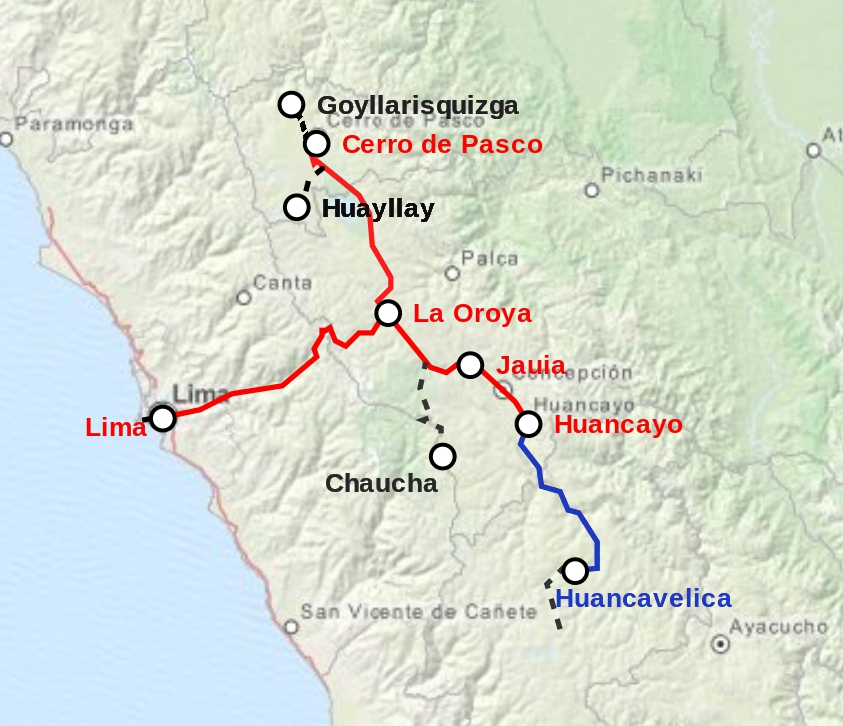
Ferrocarril Central Andino

Work began with the ceremonial laying of the foundation stone on January 1, 1870, in Lima. The execution works began on January 20 of that year. Initially, they ran smoothly, as the lines ran along the well-developed valley of the Rímac River. From 54 kilometers, in an area located at an altitude of 860 m above sea level. Chosica station, the construction entered a mountainous area. After four years of work in extremely difficult climatic and terrain conditions, the railway was traversing the slopes of the mountains, building rock shelves, carving 63 tunnels with a total length of over 6,000 m and building a number of bridges. Among them, one of the largest at that time in the world, 77 m and 175 m long (the so-called Verrugas viaduct) was built. There are big discrepancies in the number of bridges erected. Biographical studies mention the number of 30 bridges built by Malinowski. Watt Stewart, the biographer of Henry Meiggs, gave the number of 61 objects with a total length of 1832 m. Ernest Malinowski in his own cost estimate envisaged 45 bridges, including 3 large ones. The 1918 official description of the railroad lists 23 bridges over 50 feet in length. Over 10 thousand people worked on the construction site. Among them were Chileans, Indigenous Peruvians from the Andes, Chinese coolies, immigrants from Italy and even people of African descent. Malinowski made sure that they had decent working conditions and that they were paid according to the contract. The railway line rose to a height of almost 5,000 m above sea level, becoming a phenomenon of the then technology, including thanks to the use of 10 "zigzags" (reversals) sections, on which the train direction changes. All major technical magazines in the world wrote about this railway, and especially about the bridges and tunnels on its route, and Ernest Malinowski gained the fame of an outstanding engineer. Ernest Malinowski personally supervised the works, imported materials and rolling stock, kept the accounts on an ongoing basis and corresponded with suppliers, including foreign ones. "He was literally everywhere. On ropes, he ordered himself to be lowered to the bottom of the abyss to test the strength of the soil in the places where the bridge pillars were to be found; how a climber climbed the inaccessible slopes of the mountains to solve detailed technical problems on the spot and direct the robots. He spent the night in a tent in the top parts of the mountains, where the temperature in the morning drops to -14 °C, and the morning heat reaches 26 °C. Together with the workers, he endured snowstorms and scorching sun rays."

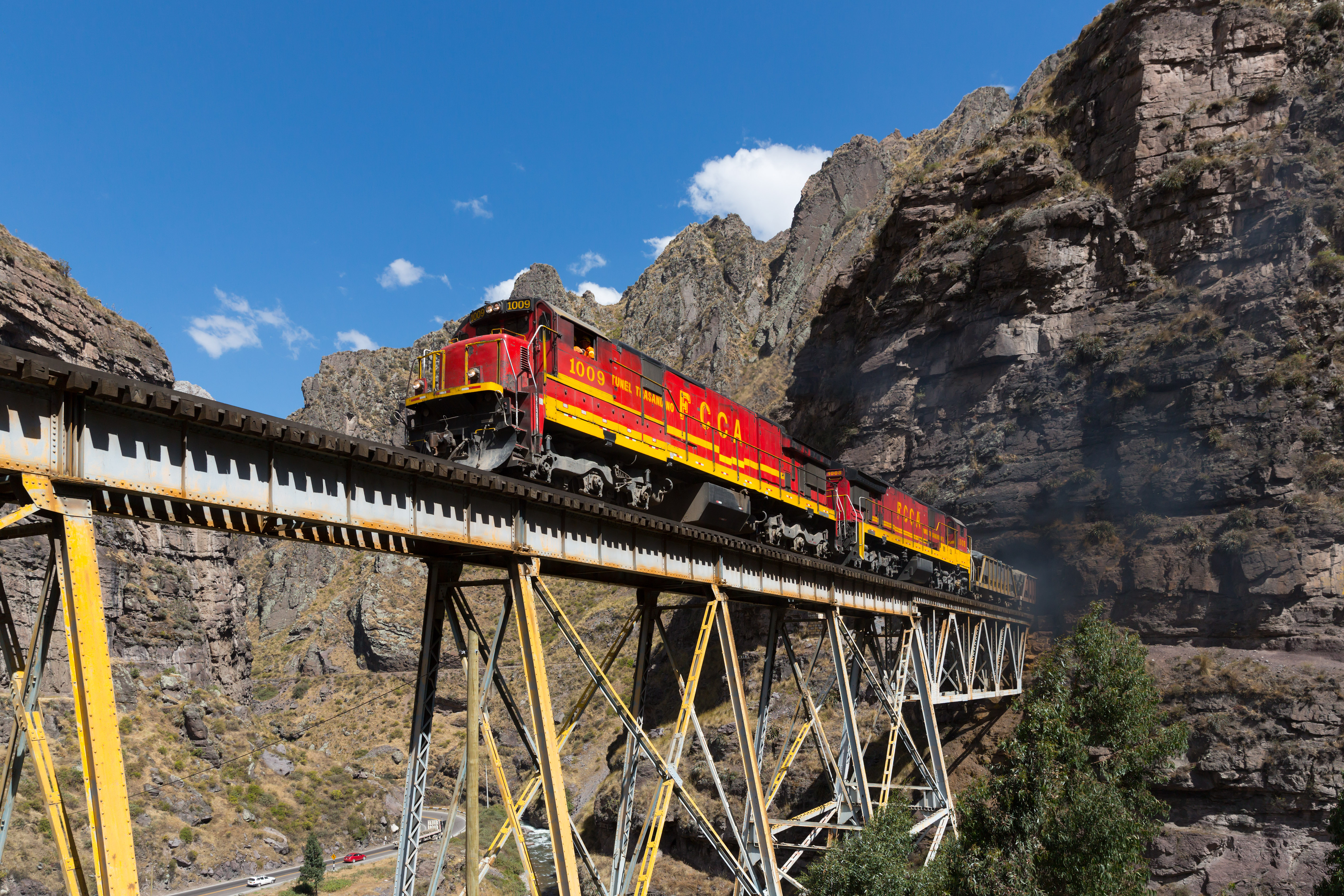
Crossing a steel bridge between Rio Blanco and San Mateo

In 1874, a financial crash occurred in Peru, and the state suspended subsidies for the construction of the railroad. Meiggs' enterprise continued construction with its own funds. Ernest Malinowski also contributed to the financing of further works. Using the money of the American entrepreneur and Ernest Malinowski, the remaining tunnels were punctured, the assembly of bridges was completed and embankments were built for the tracks to Oroja itself. Thanks to these works, the Trans-Andean railway climbed 4,817.8 m above sea level, reaching the highest railway point in the world in the town called La Cima (until 2005, when the higher section of the railway line was built in Tibet). At that time, Ernest Malinowski did not receive any remuneration. The first stretch of the Callao-Chicla railway line, 141 km, was put into service in May 1878. During the war between Peru and Chile in 1879–1881 Ernest Malinowski left Peru at the turn of 1879/1880 and came to neighboring Ecuador. He worked on the construction of the Guayaquil-Quito railway line, where he oversaw the work on the "Chimbo" and "Sibambe" sections, which led through the high peaks of the Western Cordillera Mountains. While in Ecuador, he published articles about the war in Peru in the local and foreign press (New York Herald).

== Later life ==
He returned to Peru in 1886 and was employed in the construction and renovation of railways, including the Callao-Oroya line. In 1887 Ernest Malinowski, together with Władysław Folkierski and Ksawery Wakulski, took up the construction of the Tarma-La Merced railway. The report intended for the Peruvian Ministry of Public Works included technical and financial considerations for the construction. In 1890, he joined the established British-dominated company Peruvian Corporation, which took over railroads built with state money to pay off debts incurred in the early 1970s. This year, work on laying rails on tracks previously prepared by Ernest Malinowski was resumed, leading in January 1893 a railway line to the city of La Oroya. The so-called main route of the Trans-Andean Railway. While in Ecuador, Ernest Malinowski became one of the founding members of Club Nacional, an institution established in 1884 in Lima by influential and wealthy people.

Upon his return to Lima, he attended the weekly meetings. From May 1886 he was an active member of the Charitable Societies (Sociedad de Beneficiencia Pública), where he dealt with financial matters and acted as an inspector on behalf of this institution, and supervised the construction of the Dos de Mayo hospital. He was a founding member of Sociedad Geográfica de Lima, established in 1888. As part of the society's activities, Ernest Malinowski participated in the development of topographic plans and maps that were used to mark the border between Peru, Ecuador and Brazil. He contributed to the publication of a several-volume work by the geographer and biologist Antonio Raimondi (Spanish), El Peru. Ernest Malinowski donated a number of books to the library under construction at the Geographical Society and the San Marcos University in Lima and the local Escuela de Ingenieros Civiles y de Minas. From August 14, 1889, to June 26, 1890, during the absence of the director of the latter university, Edward Habich, he was his deputy. Due to his special career achievements, he was elected president of the Instituto Técnico Industrial in Lima, but he resigned from this position for health reasons.

There are opinions about the appointment in 1888 of Ernest Malinowski to the position of professor of the Department of Topography and the election in 1889, after Władysław Folkierski, dean of the mathematics and natural science faculty of the University of Lima. Others report that Ernest Malinowski took the chair of mathematics at the University of Lima in 1888 and was elected dean of the faculty of mathematics and natural sciences in 1889. With the current state of research, it is difficult to refer to this information. He published La moneda en el Perú (Lima 1856) and Ferrocaril Central-Transandino (Lima 1869). As the director of the Escuela de Ingenieros Civiles y de Minas, he wrote several articles for the journal Boletin de Minas, published by the university. Ernest Malinowski knew English, French and Spanish perfectly both orally and in writing - apart from Polish and Russian - and was thoroughly familiar with both classical and contemporary literature of these three languages. In Lima, he lived in an apartment in an elegant hotel on Portal de Botoneros 52 (now defunct). He ran an open house, employed a French cook, served breakfasts and dinners to Peruvian dignitaries, foreign diplomats, scientists and journalists. He made short trips by train for diplomats and professionals from various countries. He never married, although he was an object of interest to many women. In the light of contemporary opinions, he was considered an intelligent, elegant person, an ornament of salons, but also a shy and a bit sad person. He contributed to the employment of Polish engineers in Peru, including Edward Habich, Aleksander Miecznikowski, Władysław Folkierski, Władysław Kluger, Ksawery Wakulski, Aleksander Babinski. He helped Polish biologists and travelers, for example Konstanty Jelski and Józef Siemiradzki.

== Death ==
He died of a heart attack on March 2, 1899, at 3:30 am in his hotel apartment in Lima. He was buried with honors due to the national hero on March 3 at the "Presbitero Maestro" cemetery, among the graves of many people, but the following year, at the request of the presidential Prado family, the remains were moved to the place of individual graves. The tomb is decorated with a modest marble obelisk. The death of Ernest Malinowski was recorded by all major Peruvian magazines and newspapers, as well as French and Polish magazine.

== Remembrance ==
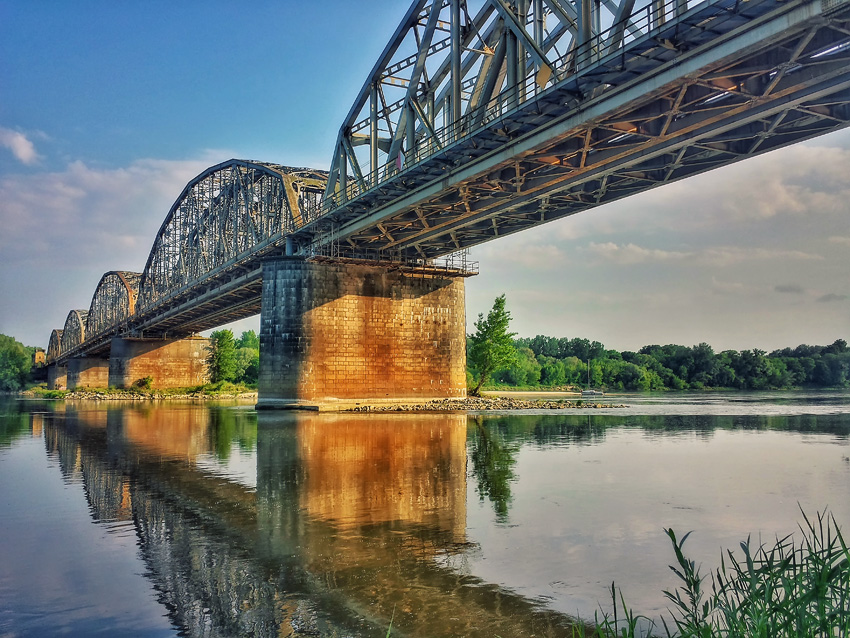
The Ernest Malinowski Bridge in Toruń

In 1979, a commemorative plaque dedicated to Malinowski was unveiled at the Desamparados Station in Lima. The same year, Polish filmmaker Roman Dobrzański, directed a documentary film Eagles and Condors (Orły i kondory) dedicated to the life and work of Ernest Malinowski.

In 1996, a commemorative plaque was unveiled at the Real Felipe Fortress located in the Peruvian town of Callao on the 130th anniversary of the Battle of Callao commemorating the contributions of Ernest Malinowski in the battle.

In 1999, a railway bridge over the Vistula River in Toruń was officially given the name of Ernest Malinowski Bridge in memory of the engineer. The same year, the National Bank of Poland (NBP) issued a 2-zloty commemorative coin on the 100th anniversary of Malinowski's death as part of a series called "Polish Travellers and Explorers" while the Polish Post introduced a 1-zloty stamp in his memory designed by Jacek Konarzewski. The Ernest Malinowski Monument, a 7-meter tall bronze statue of the engineer designed by sculptor Gustaw Zemła was also erected at the Ticlio Pass, the highest point of the Ferrocarril Central Andino, with the following inscription: "Ernest Malinowski 1818–1899. Polish engineer, Peruvian patriot, hero of the Defence of Callao, constructor of Ferrocarril Central Andino".

== See also ==
- List of highest railways
- History of rail transport
- List of Poles
