= Silesian Insurgents Memorial =

Coordinates: 50°15′50″N 19°1′26″E

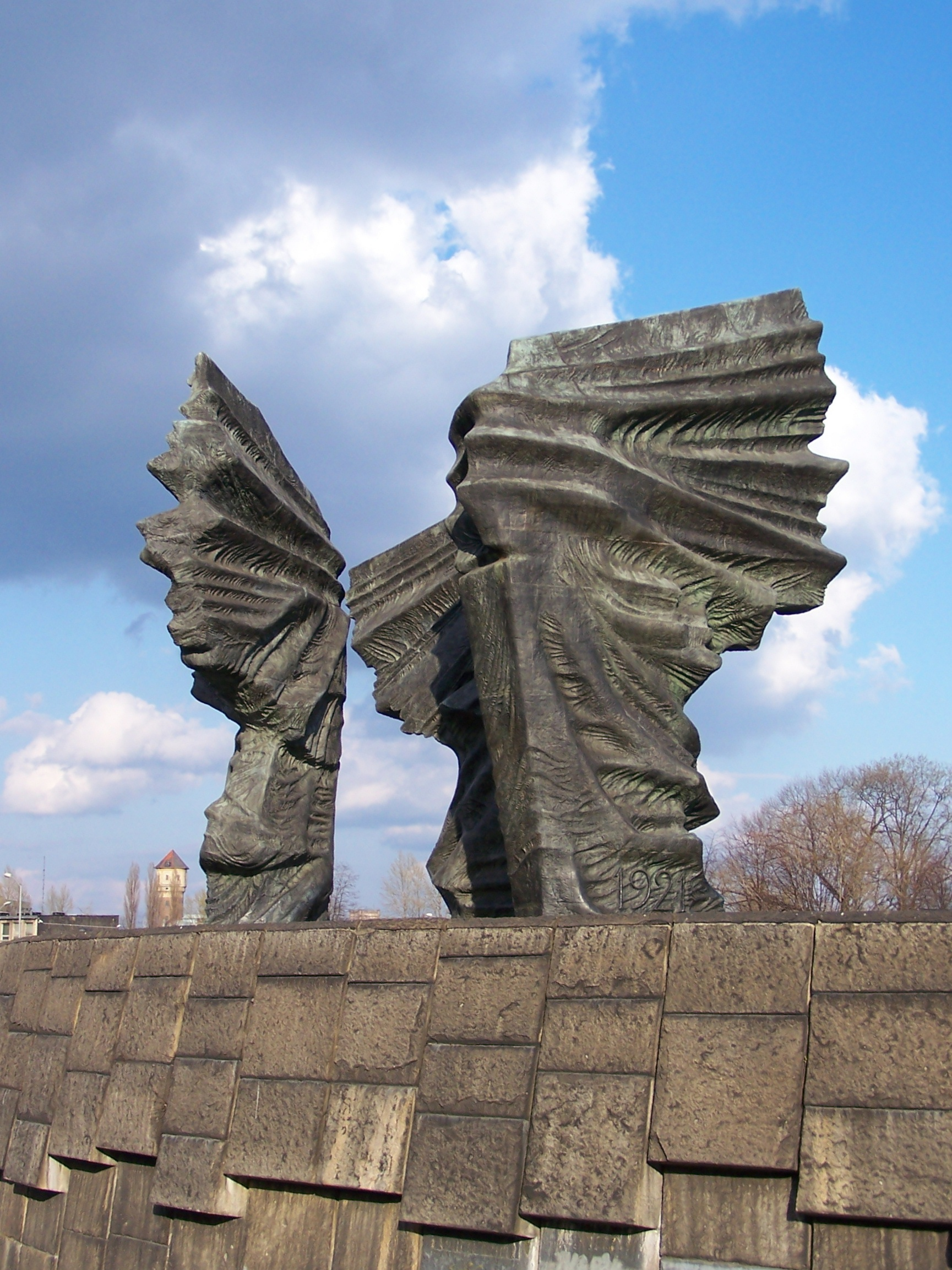
The Silesian Insurgents' Monument in Katowice, 2007

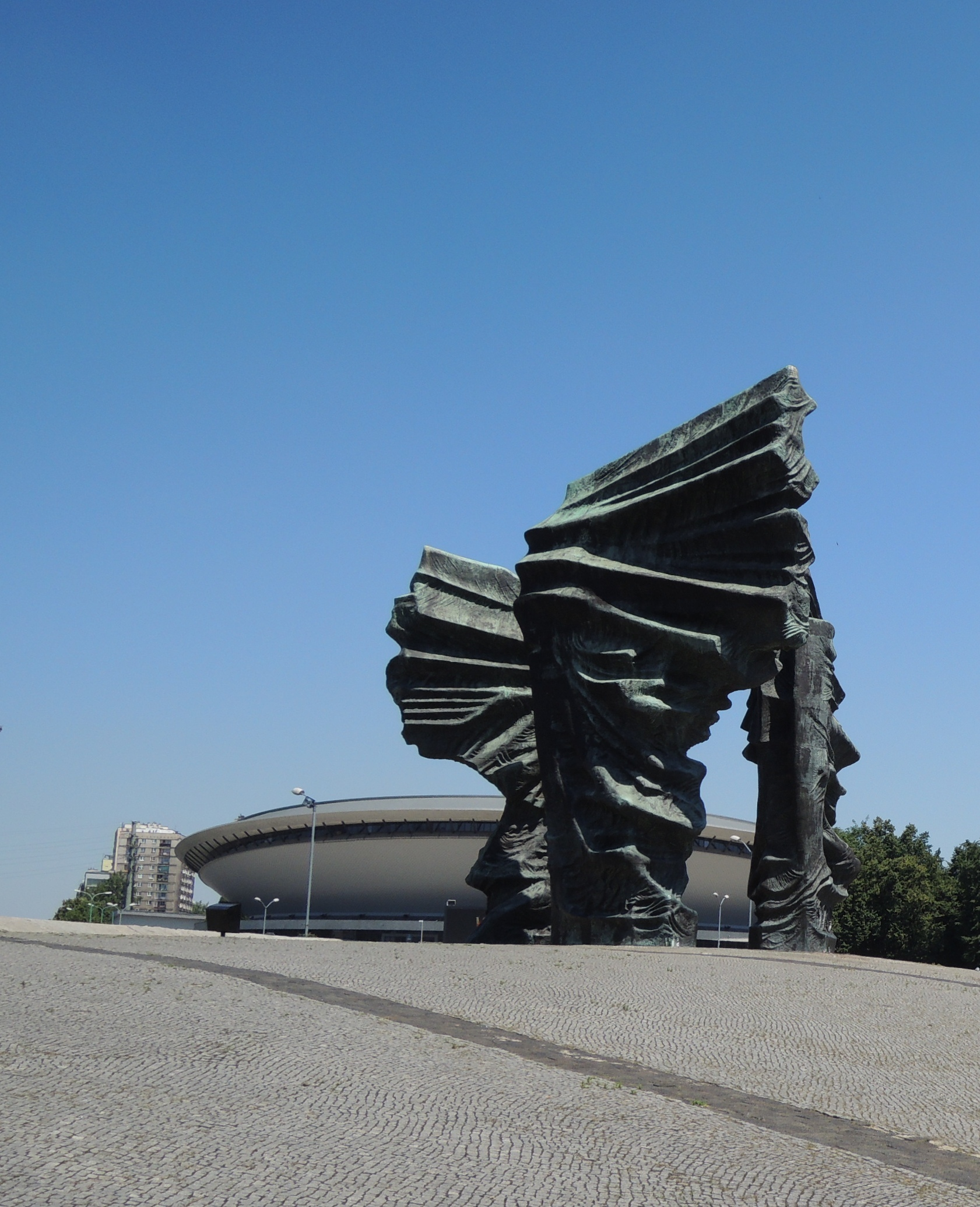
The Silesian Insurgents' Monument in context, 2014

The Silesian Insurgents Memorial (Polish: Pomnik Powstańców Śląskich) in Katowice, southern Poland, it is a monument to those who took part in the three Silesian Uprisings of 1919, 1920 and 1921. These uprisings aimed to make the region of Upper Silesia part of the newly independent Polish state. It is located nearby to the Spodek.

The monument was unveiled on 1 September 1967, and was designed by sculptor Gustaw Zemła and architect Wojciech Zabłocki. The wings symbolize the three uprisings, and the names of places where battles were fought are etched on the vertical slopes. The monument was funded by the people of Warsaw for Upper Silesia.
