= Ernest Malinowski Memorial =

Sculpture on the Ticlio

Ernest Malinowski Monument
- Interactive map of Ernest Malinowski Monument
- Location: Ticlio, Chicla District, Department of Lima, Peru
- Coordinates: 11°36′42″S 76°11′28″W
- Designer: Gustaw Zemła
- Type: Sculpture
- Material: Granite, bronze
- Completion date: 2 March 1999
- Dedicated to: Ernest Malinowski

The Ernest Malinowski Monument (Note: Spanish: Monumento a Ernest Malinowski, Monumento a Ernesto Malinowski; Polish: Pomnik Ernesta Malinowskiego) is a sculpture located at the highest point of the Ticlio, a mountain pass in the Department of Lima, Peru, within the Chicla District. It is dedicated to Ernest Malinowski, an engineer who designed the Ferrocarril Central Andino railway in Peru. The monument was designed by sculptor Gustaw Zemła, and unveiled on 2 March 1999, on the hundredth anniversary of Malinowski's death. It is placed at 4,818 m (15,807 ft) above mean sea level, which makes it one of the highest-placed monument in the world.

== History ==
The monument was designed by sculptor Gustaw Zemła, and dedicated to Ernest Malinowski, an engineer who designed the Ferrocarril Central Andino railway in Peru. The monument was unveiled on 2 March 1999, on the hundredth anniversary of Malinowski's death.

== Characteristics ==
The monument is located at the highest point of the Ticlio, a mountain pass in the Department of Lima, Peru, within the Chicla District, which is also the highest point of the Ferrocarril Central Andino railway. It is placed at 4,818 m (15,807 ft) above mean sea level, which makes it one of the highest-placed memorials in the world.

It consists of a granite cuboid pedestal, which features coats of arms of Peru and Poland, and inscriptions in Spanish and Polish, which translates to "Polish engineer, Peruvian patriot, hero of the Defence of Callao of 1866, the designer and constructor of the Ferrocarril Central Andino [Andian Central Railway]". On top is placed a granite cylinder facing to the front with a flat side, with a bronze relief depicting the face of Ernest Malinowski, to whom the monument was dedicated. The height of the monument is 7 m (22.97 ft).
