= Monument to the Battle of Monte Cassino, Warsaw =

Monument in Warsaw, Poland

Monument to the Battle of Monte Cassino in Warsaw
- Pomnik Bitwy o Monte Cassino w Warszawie
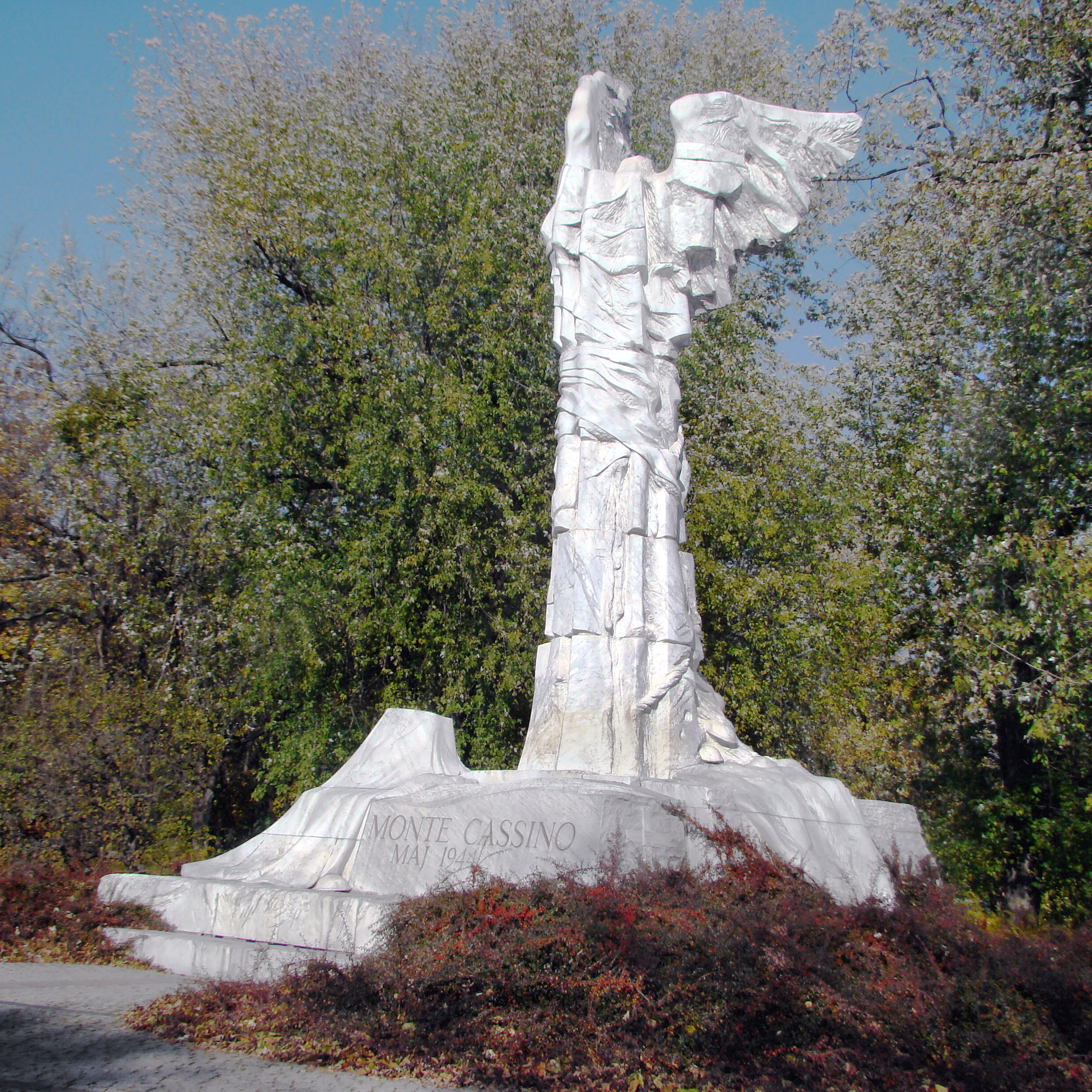
- The monument to the Battle of Monte Cassino
- Interactive map of Monument to the Battle of Monte Cassino in Warsaw
- Location: The square between General Anders Street and the gates of the Krasiński Gardens
- Coordinates: 52°14′49.6″N 21°00′01.18″E
- Designer: Gustaw Zemła (sculpture), Wojciech Zabłocki (architect)
- Material: Reinforced concrete covered with white marble
- Height: 12 m (39 ft)
- Opening date: May 30, 1999
- Dedicated to: The Battle of Monte Cassino

The Monument to the Battle of Monte Cassino (Polish: Pomnik Bitwy o Monte Cassino w Warszawie) is a monument in Warsaw, Poland located in the square between General Anders Street and the gates of the Krasiński Gardens near the National Archaeological Museum in the Warsaw Arsenal.

== History ==
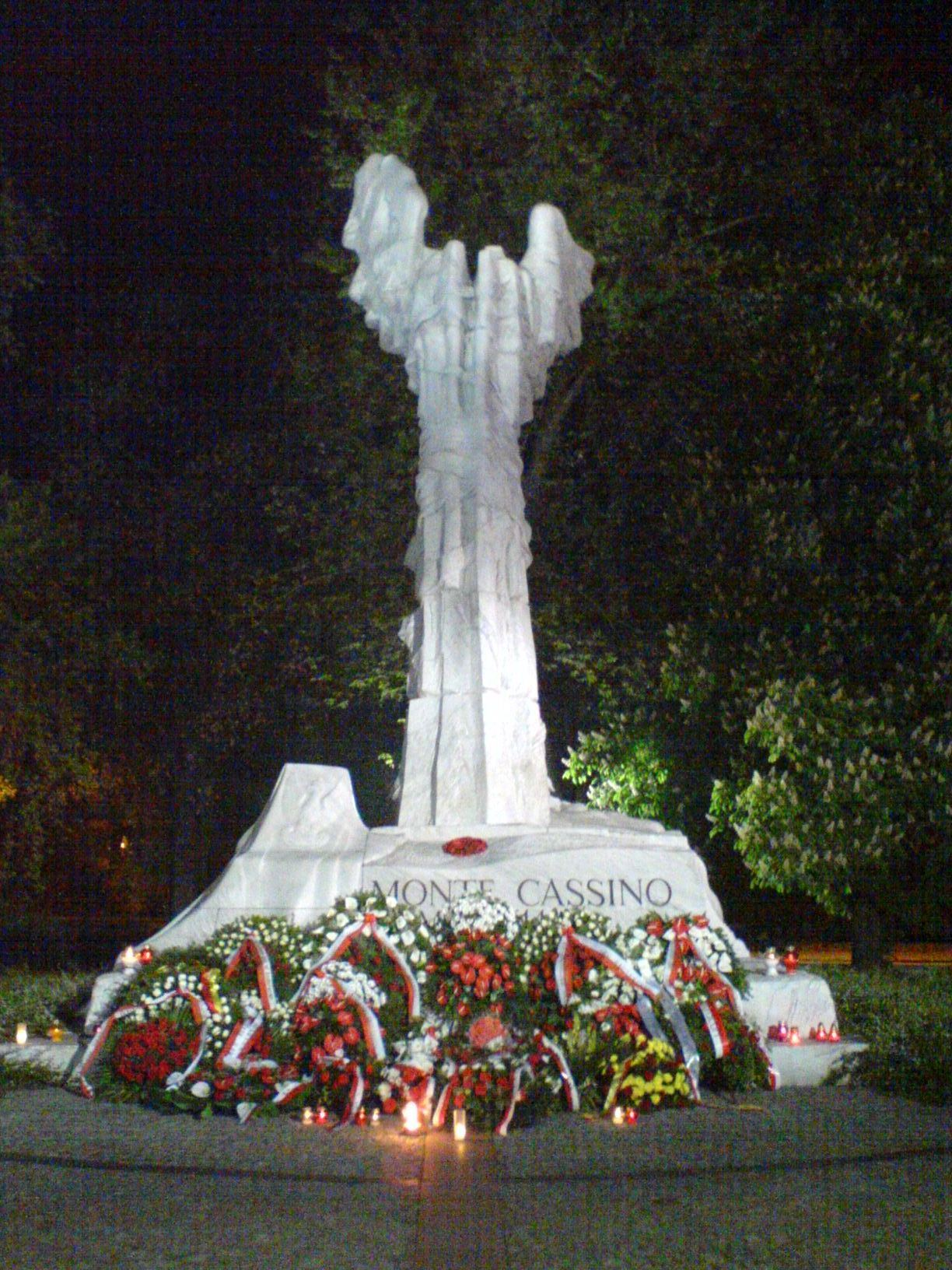
The monument at night

In December 1994 the Social Committee for Construction of the Monument of the Battle of Monte Cassino in Warsaw chose the current location for the monument. In June 1995, the Association of Polish Architects (Stowarzyszenie Architektów Polskich) announced a competition for a monument commemorating the Polish contribution to the Battle of Monte Cassino. The monument was financed by contributions from veterans of the Polish Army 2nd Corps, who captured Monte Cassino on 18 May 1944, and grants from numerous institutions.

It was unveiled on 30 May 1999 by Irena Anders, widow of General Władysław Anders (commander of the 2nd Corps), assisted by an honor guard of the Polish Army, in a ceremony that also commemorated the 55th anniversary of the battle. During the ceremony, the President of Poland was represented by the Head of the Chancellery of the President of the Republic of Poland, Ryszard Kalisz.

== Construction ==
The monument was designed by sculptor Kazimierz Gustaw Zemła and architect Wojciech Zabłocki. It is made of reinforced concrete covered with white Carrara marble and weighs 220 tonnes. To stabilise the ground under the 70-tonne column which is the highest element of the composition, six metre holes were dug into the ground.

The statue is a headless Nike with traces of fighting and injury, in the form of a 12-metre column. Within the base of the monument can be seen the hill of Monte Cassino covered with a shroud, the figure of the Virgin Mary and scattered helmets. The two-metre pedestal is engraved with the Cross of Monte Cassino, the emblems of the five Polish units that took part in the battle, a Polish eagle and an urn containing ashes of the heroes.

There are two smaller memorials adjacent to the main monument. The first is adorned with a plaque featuring an image of General Władysław Anders and the second is a "monument of gratitude" to the people of Persia (now Iran) who generously welcomed over 120,000 Polish refugees escaping from the Soviet Union with the Anders Army in 1942.

== Gallery ==
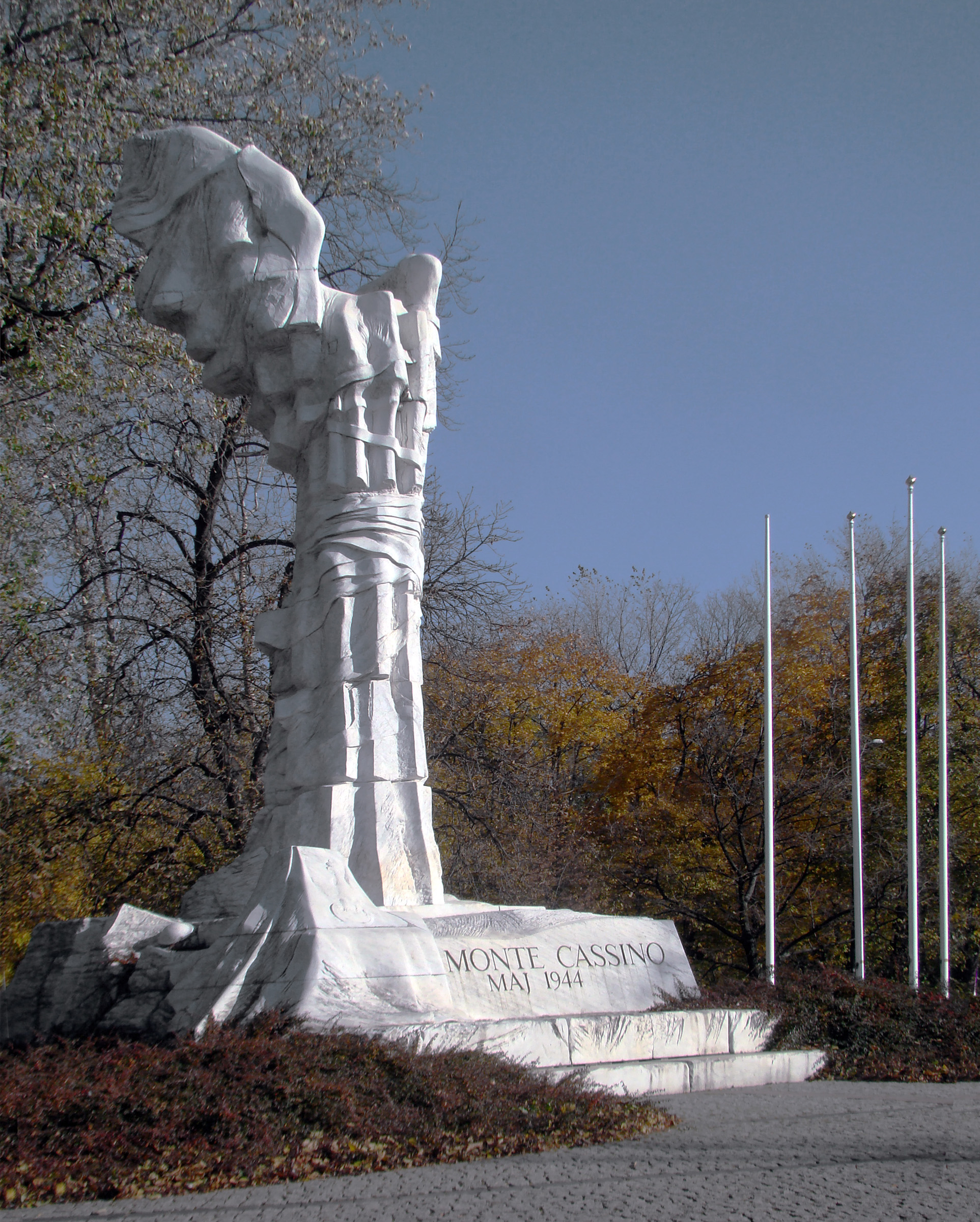
Side view of the monument

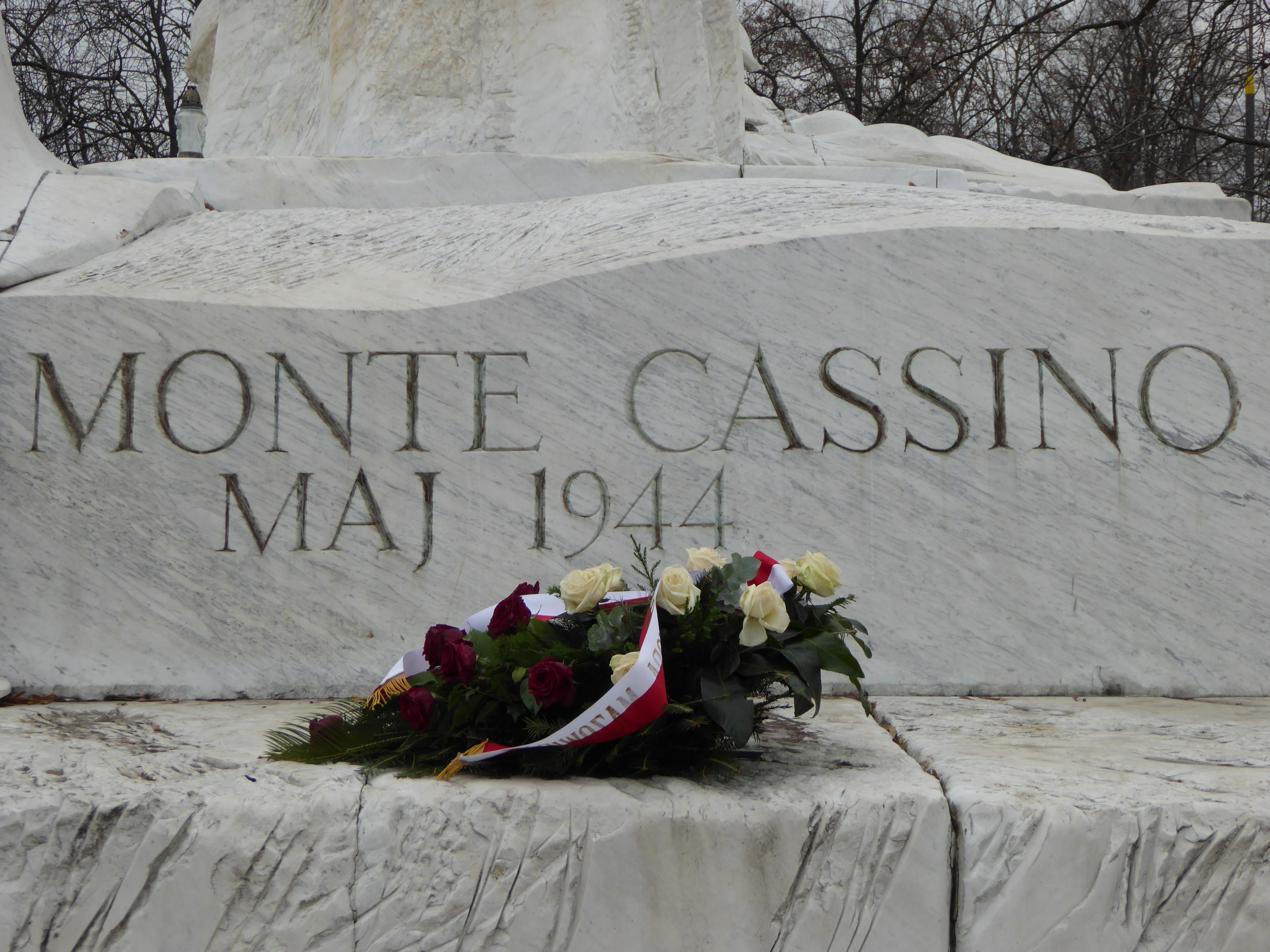
The inscription on the front of the monument

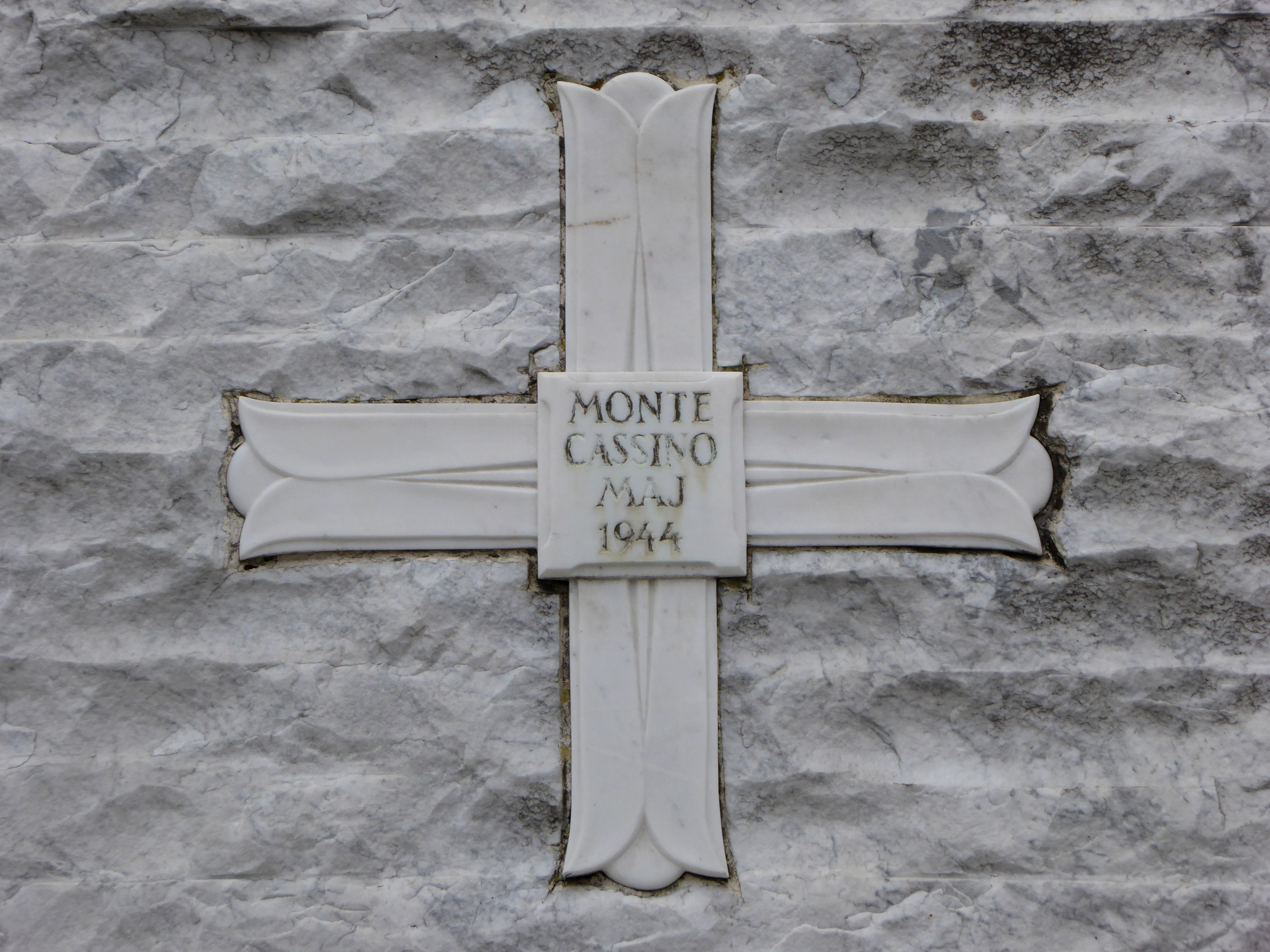
Monte Cassino cross

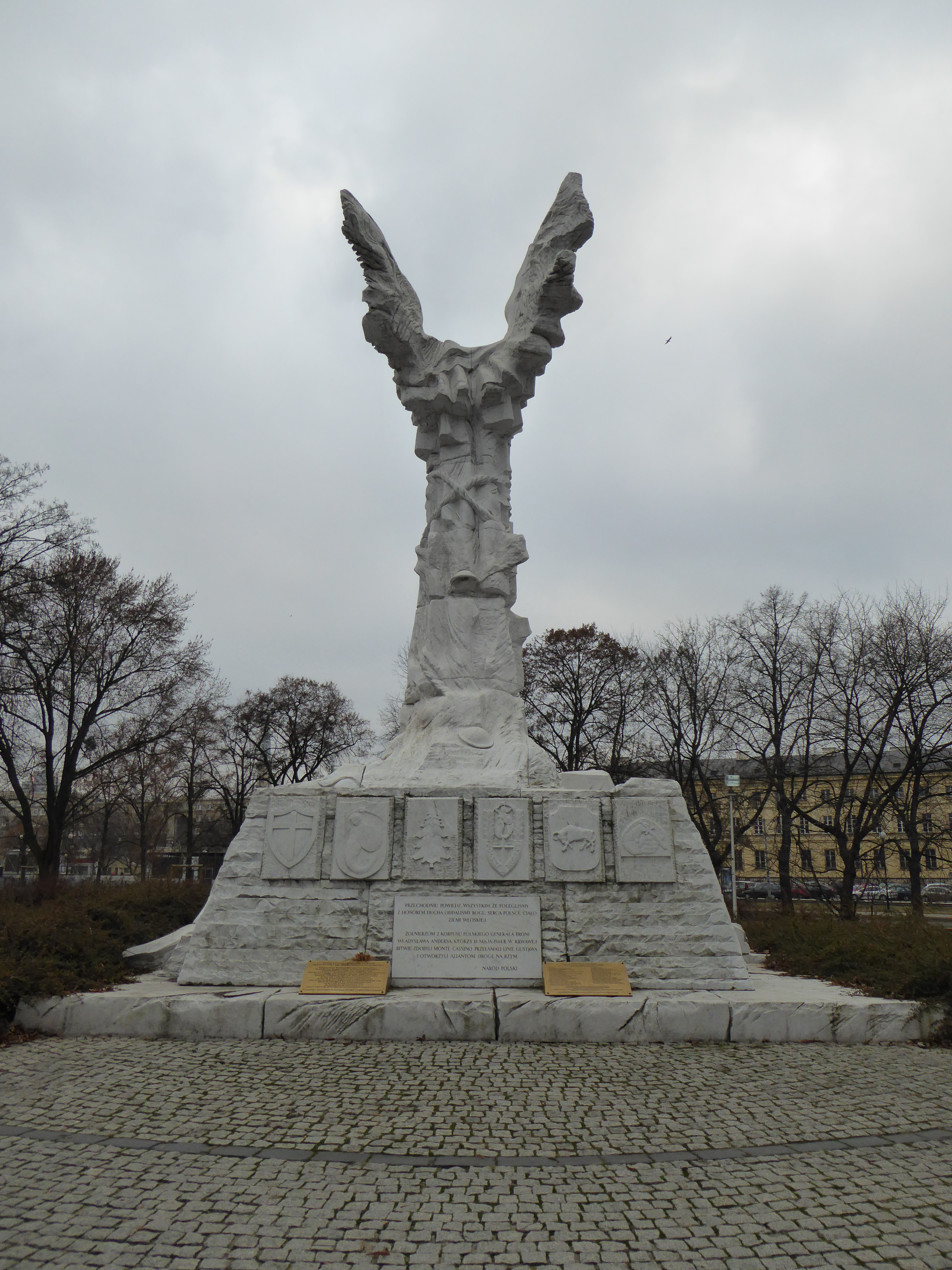
The back of the monument

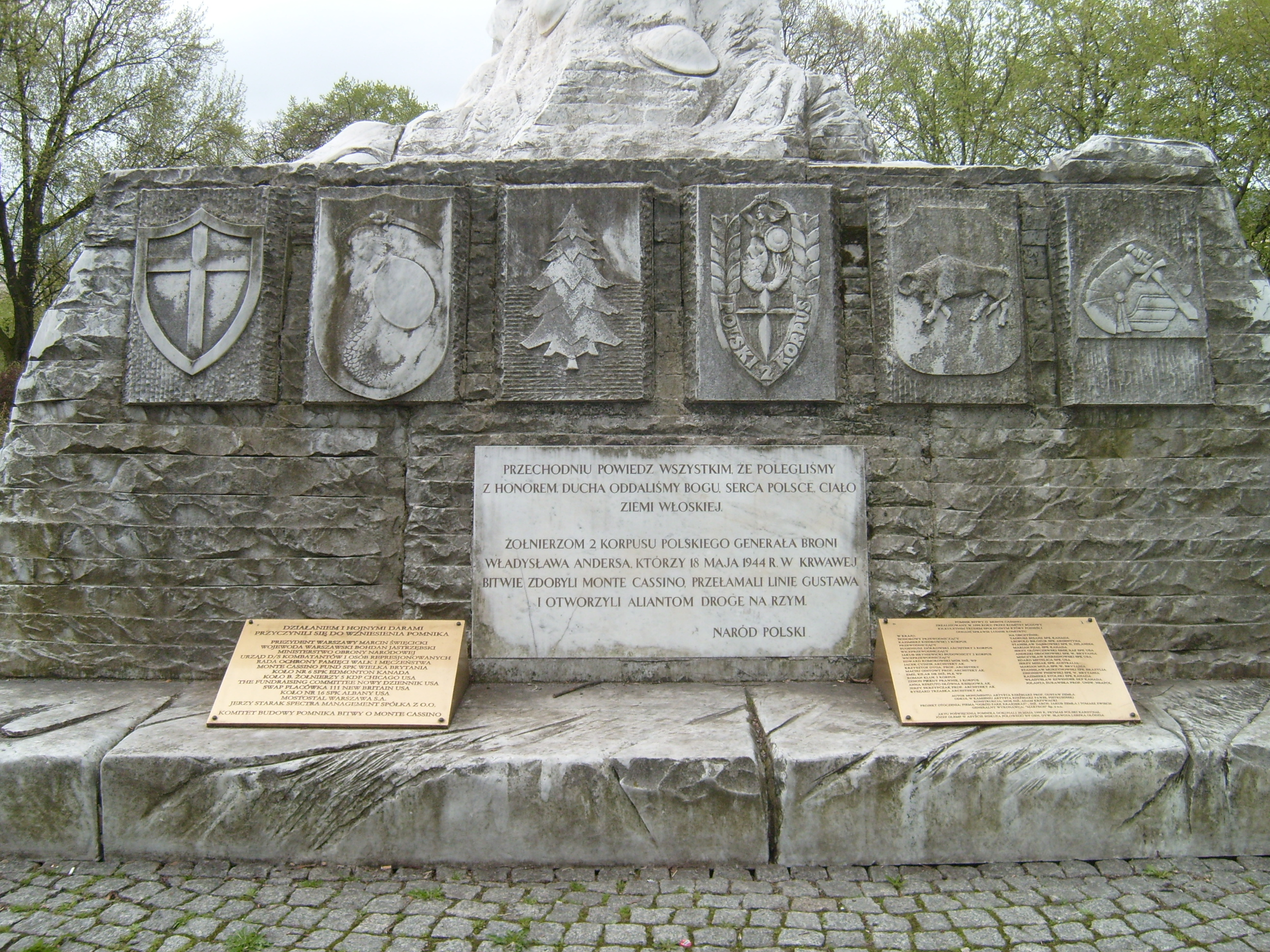
Close up of the back of the monument

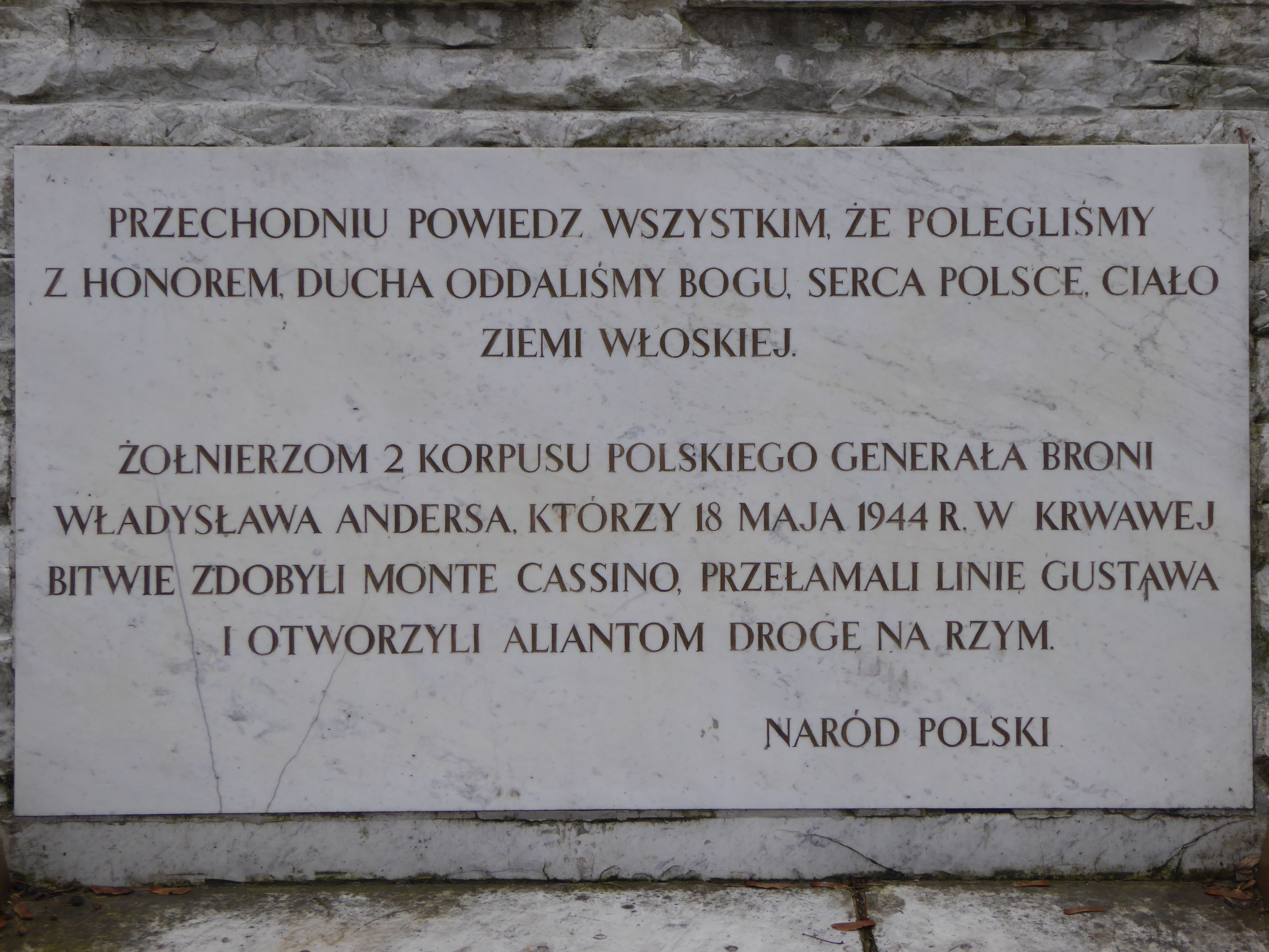
The inscription on the back of the monument

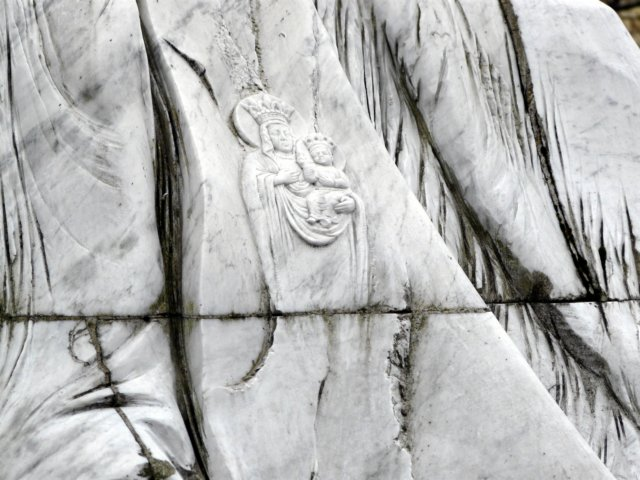
The figure of the Virgin Mary

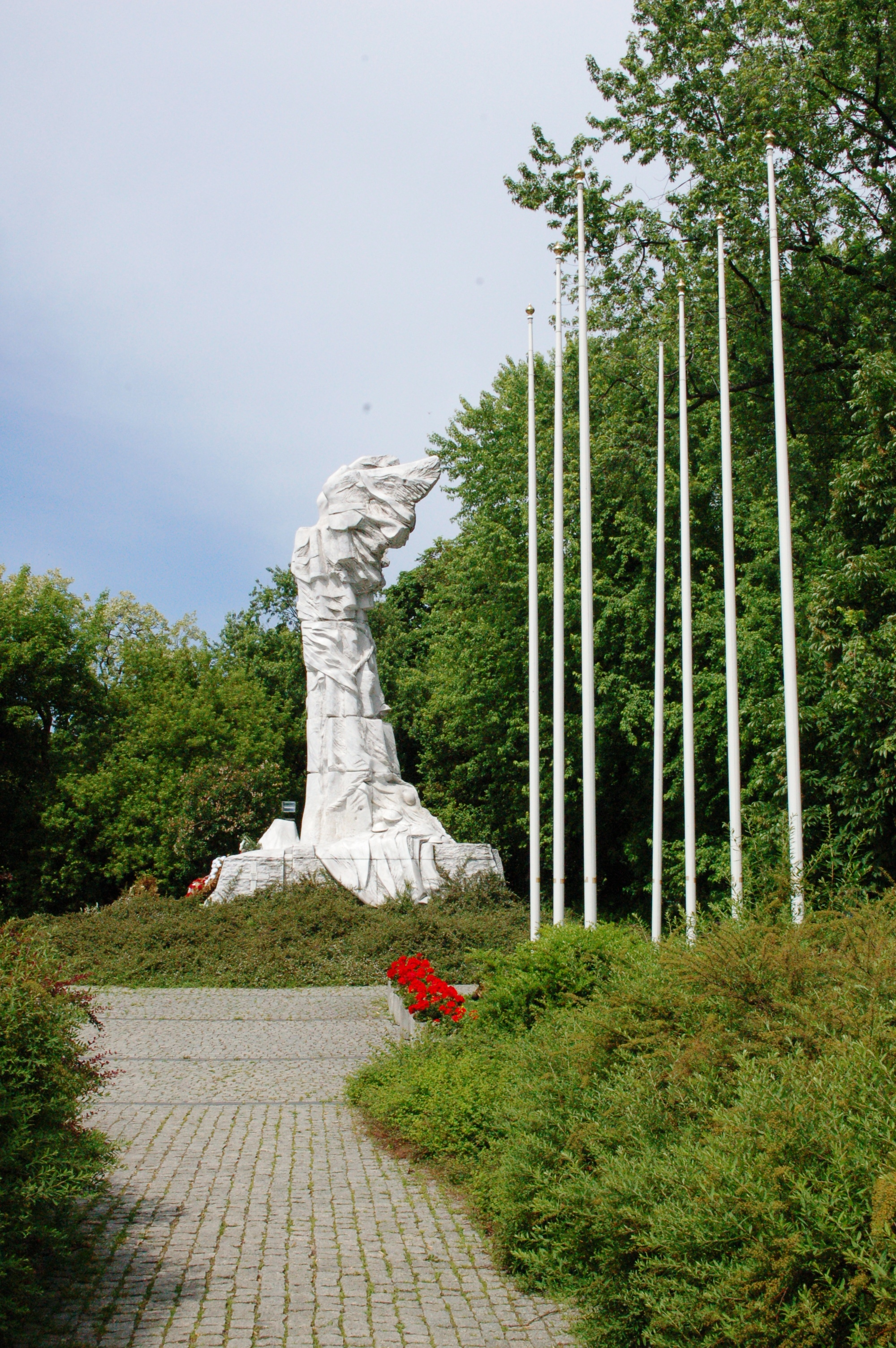
Side view of the monument

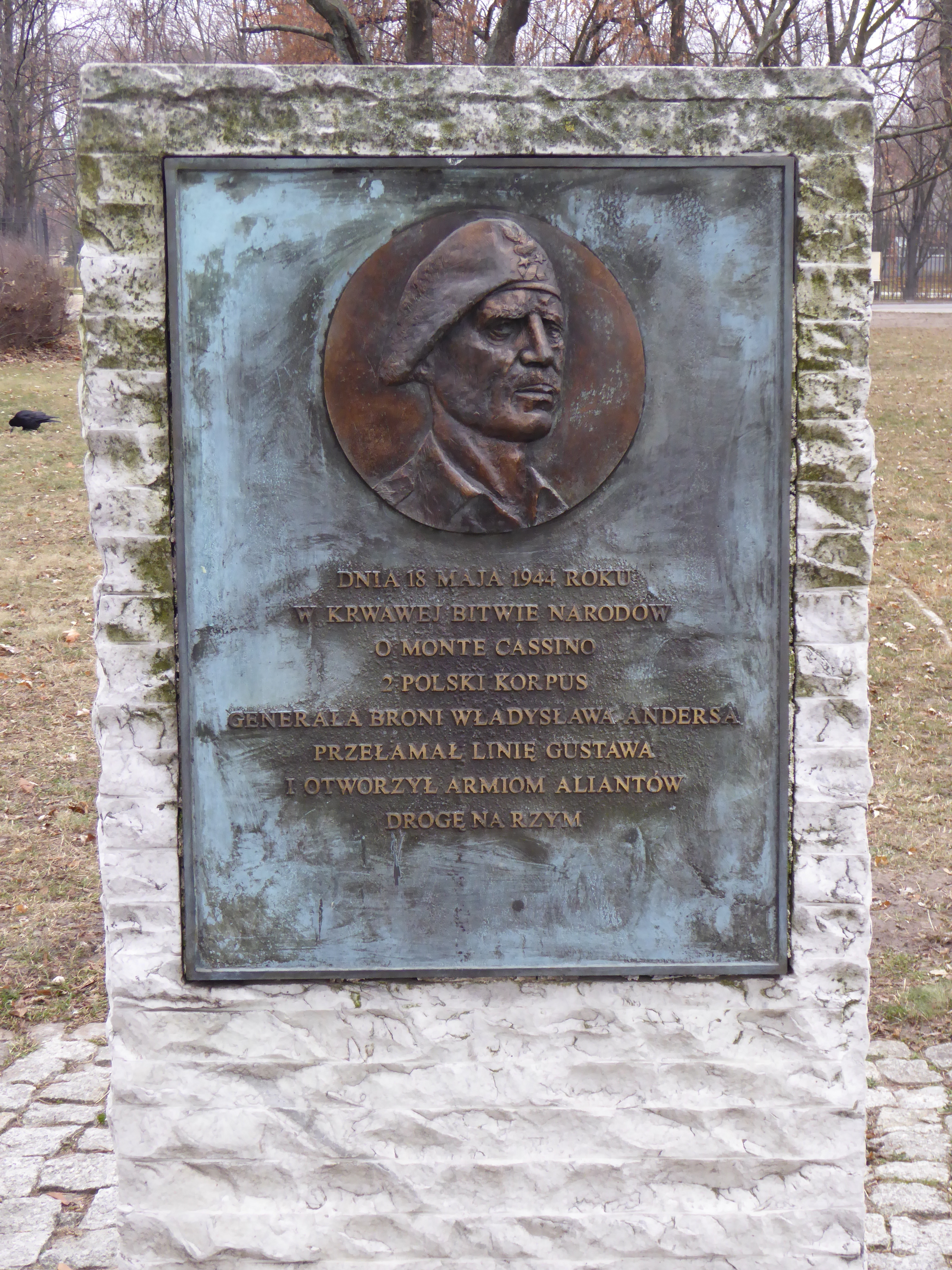
The smaller memorial (front)

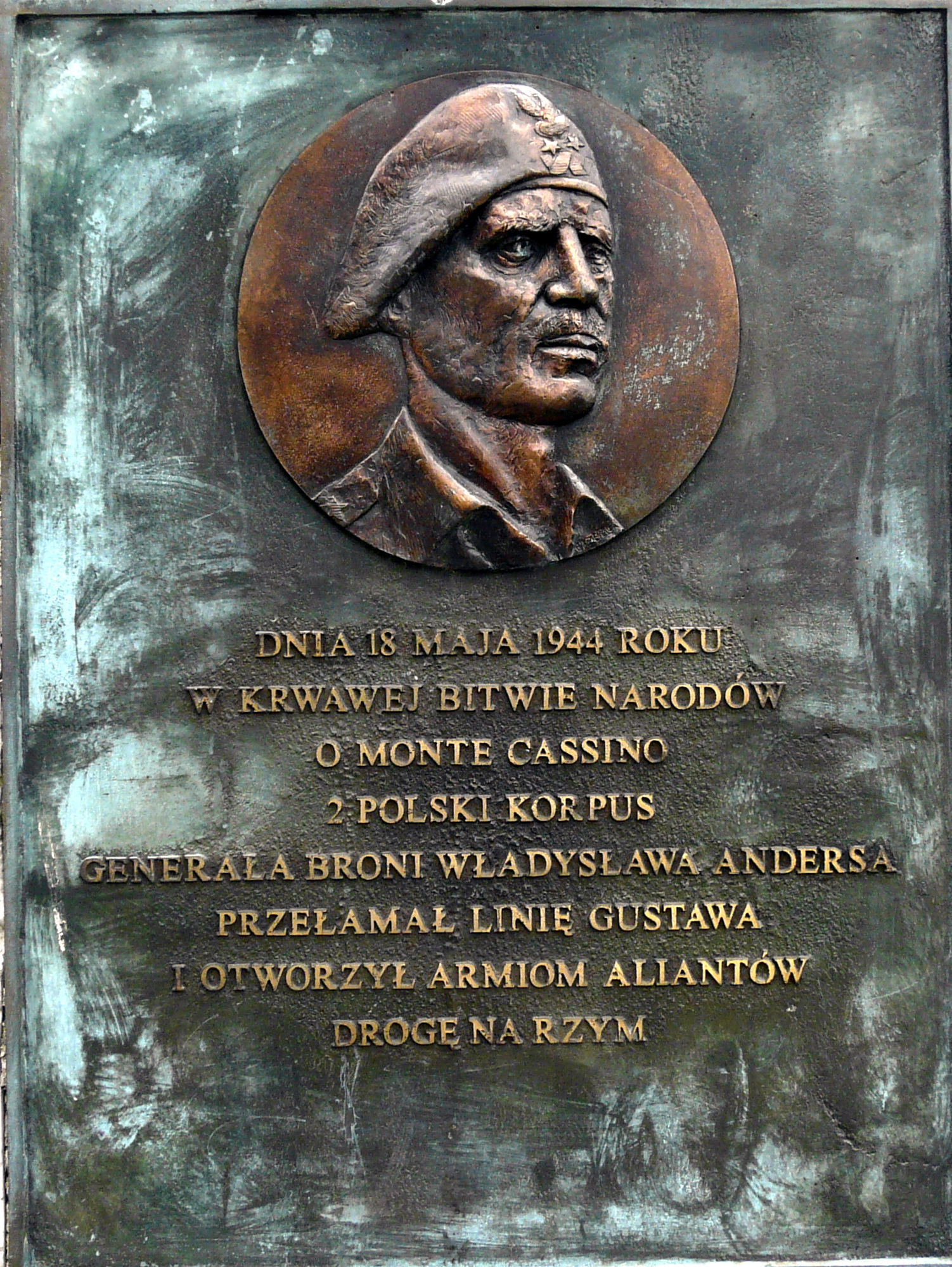
Close up of the smaller memorial (front)

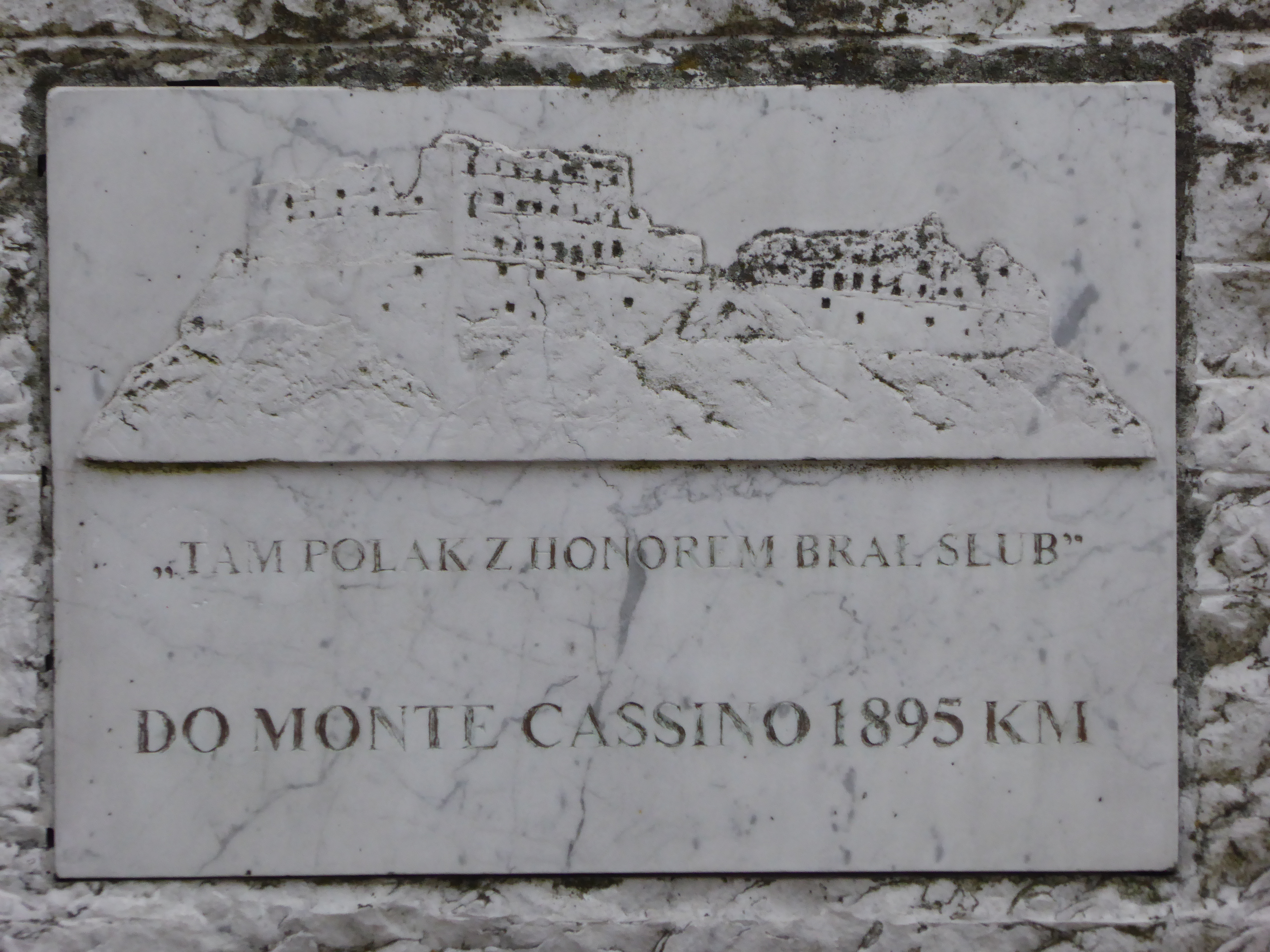
Close up of the smaller memorial (back)

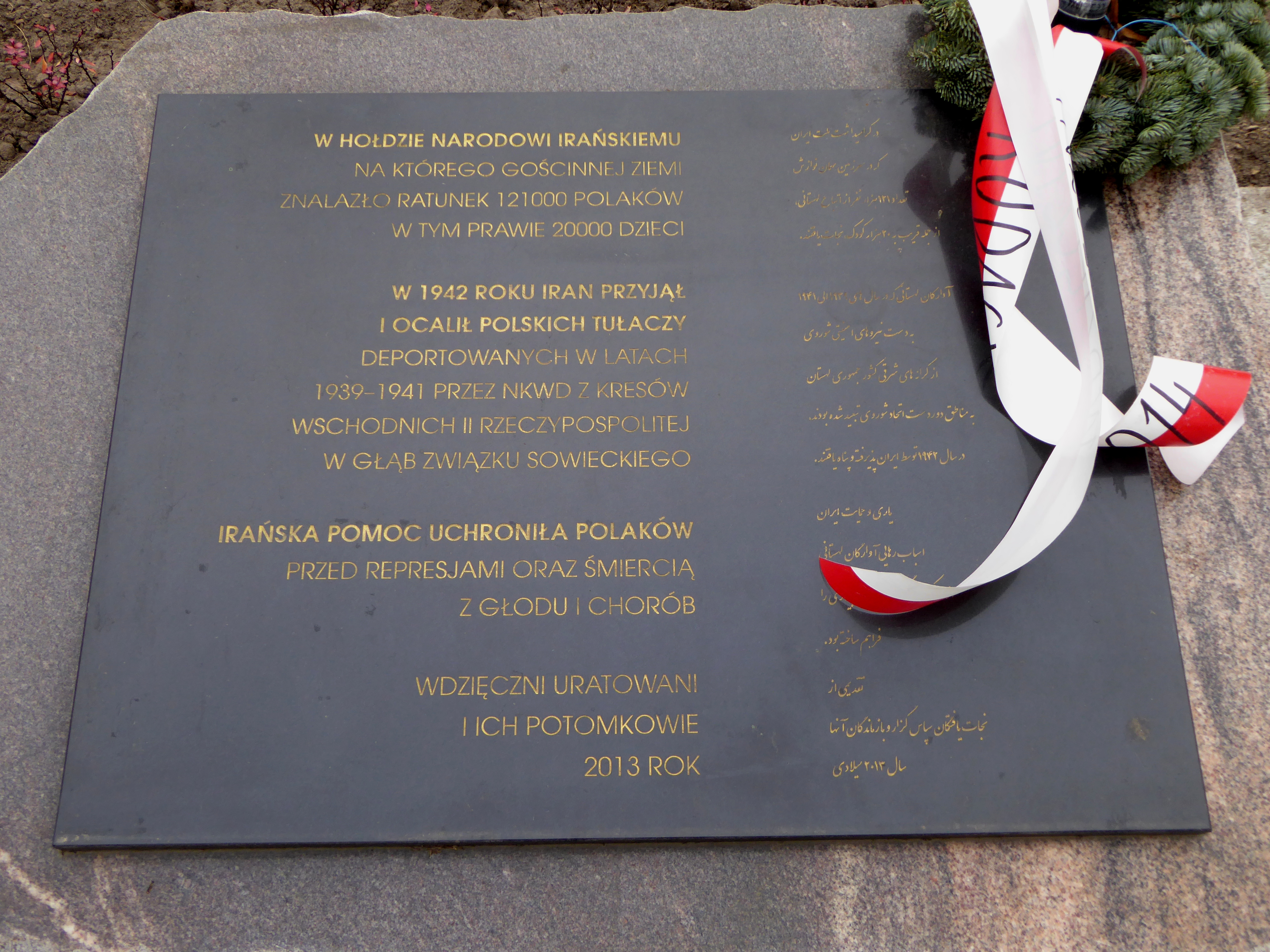
The Monument of Gratitude to the Iranian People

== Bibliography ==
- Paweł Giergoń. "Pomnik bitwy o Monte Cassino". sztuka.net (in Polish). Archived from the original on 2014-10-06.
- Tadeusz Bisanz. "Pomnik Bitwy o Monte Cassino w Warszawie". Zwoje 4, 1997 (in Polish). Archived from the original on 2016-03-05.
