= Anticona =

Mountain in Peru

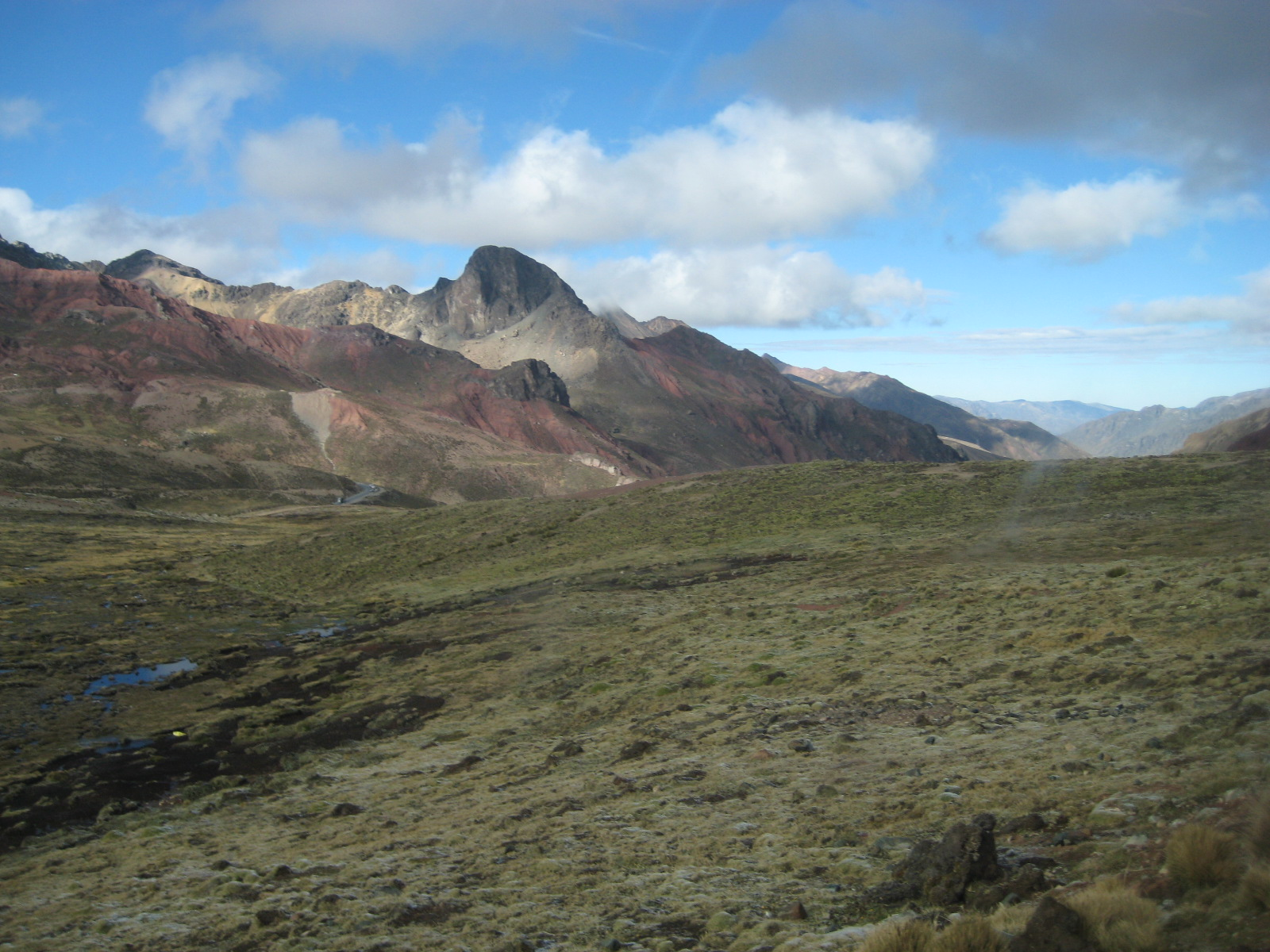
- Ridge leading to the top of Anticona

Highest point
- Elevation: 5,150 m (16,900 ft)
- Coordinates: 11°35′05″S 76°10′50″W

Geography
- Location within Peru
- Location: Peru, Junín Region, Lima Region
- Parent range: Andes

Climbing
- First ascent: West: 1-1956 via S. rocks & ridge.

Anticona (possibly from Quechua for metals or minerals, the inhabitants of the rainforest or the Andes), also called Ticlio, is a mountain in the Andes of Peru, about 5,150 metres (16,896 ft) high. It is located in the Lima Region, Huarochiri Province, Chicla District, and in the Junín Region, Yauli Province, Morococha District. Anticona lies between the Ticlio mountain pass in the southwest and Yanashinga in the northeast, northwest of a lake named Huacracocha.
