= Huacracocha (Morococha) =

Lake in Junín, Peru

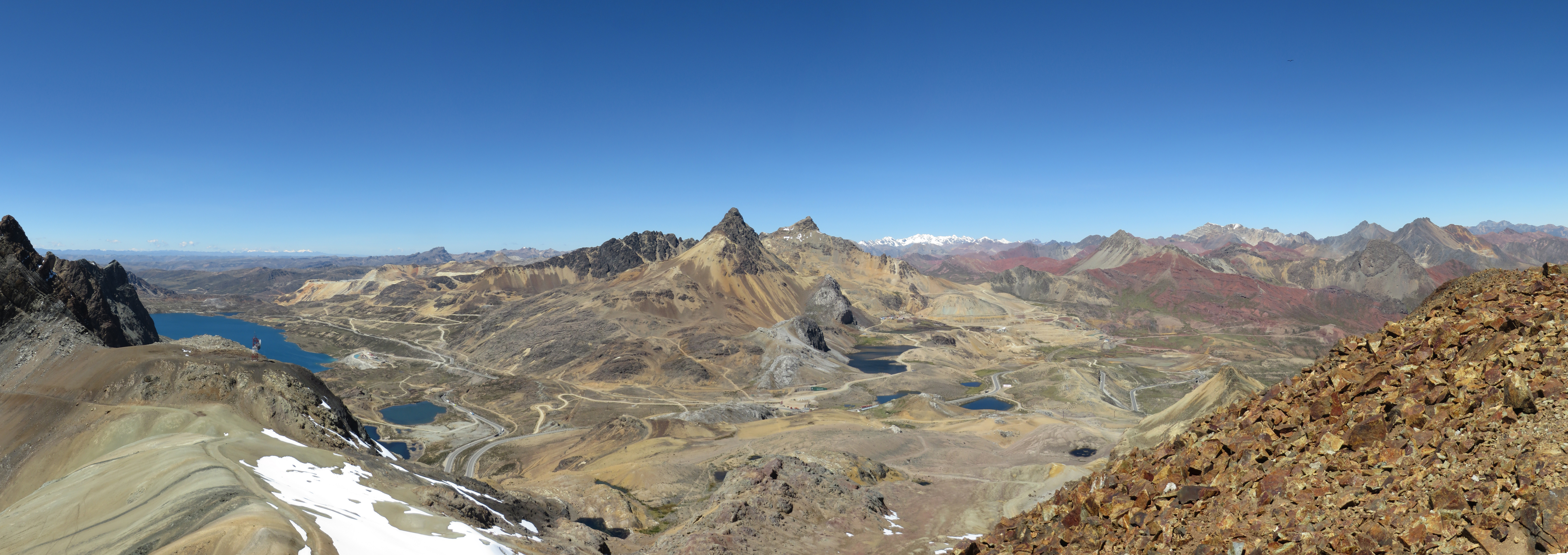
- Huacracocha (the largest lake on the left) as seen from Mount Yurajcocha

- Location within Peru
- Location: Junín Region, Yauli Province, Morococha District
- Coordinates: 11°35′38.4″S 76°09′41.1″W
- Basin countries: Peru

Huacracocha (possibly from Quechua waqra horn, qucha lake, lagoon, "horn lake") is a lake in Peru located in the Junín Region, Yauli Province, Morococha District. It lies southeast of the mountain Anticona and south of the mountain Yanashinga, near the Ticlio (Anticona) mountain pass.

== See also ==
- Tiktiqucha
- Tukumach'ay
