= Ticlio =

Mountain pass in Peru

Coordinates: 11°35′55″S 76°11′35″W

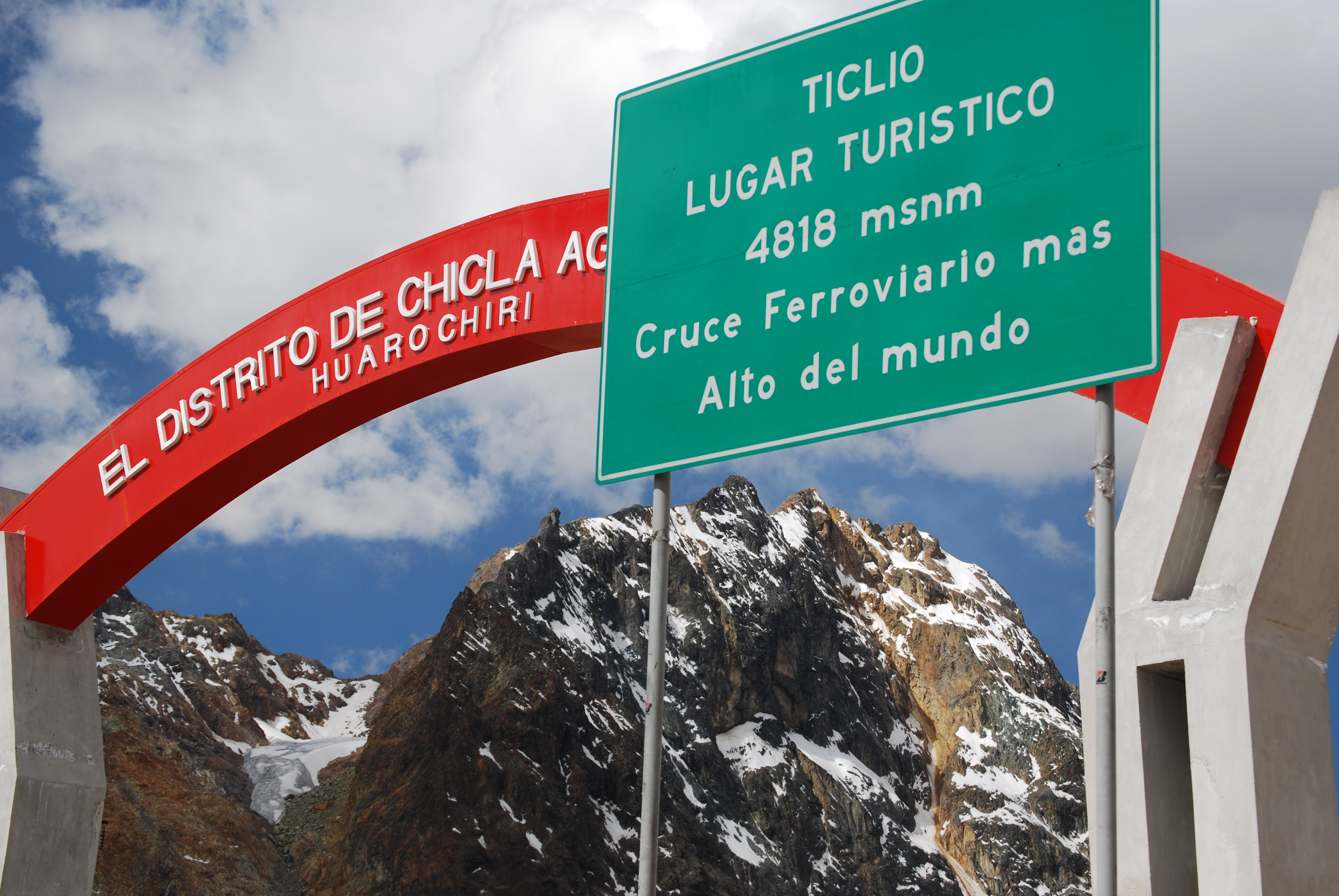
A signboard near the station of Ticlio. The green sign says, in Spanish: "TICLIO - TOURISM PLACE / 4818 m AMSL / World's highest railroad crossing"

Ticlio (or Anticona) is a mountain pass and the highest point (4,818 m or 15,807 ft) of the Central Highway of Peru (km 120), located in the Andes Mountains in the Chicla District, Huarochirí Province, Department of Lima. It used to be a railway crossing loop on the Ferrocarril Central Andino (FCCA) in Peru, whose main claim to fame was being the highest railway junction in the world. The railway now crosses the pass through the nearby Galera Summit Tunnel at a lower elevation of 4,783 m (15,692 ft) and enters a different valley than the highway on the eastern side of the pass.

== Overview ==
Ticlio Station lies at km 171 of the 1,435 mm (4 ft 8 1/2 in) standard gauge FCCA about 2 km (1.2 miles) from the highway summit at the western end of Galera Summit Tunnel. From 1893 to 1921, it was the junction for the now-closed branch to Morococha. FCCA is an active freight and passenger line (FCCA offers several tourist trips per month from Lima to Huancayo). On the railway approach to Ticlio from the direction of Lima, eight tunnels were necessary in a stretch of less than 3.2 km (2 miles).

Temperature varies between 8 and -5 °C. Atmospheric pressure in Ticlio is approximately 50% lower than the one present at sea level, which causes the vast majority of people that pass through this point to suffer altitude sickness or soroche.

At its highest point, at 4,818 m (15,807 ft), is placed the Ernest Malinowski Monument by sculptor Gustaw Zemła, which is dedicated to Ernest Malinowski, an engineer who designed the Ferrocarril Central Andino railway.

== See also ==
- Antikuna
- Qinghai–Tibet Railway
- Waqraqucha
- List of highest railway stations in the world

== Gallery ==
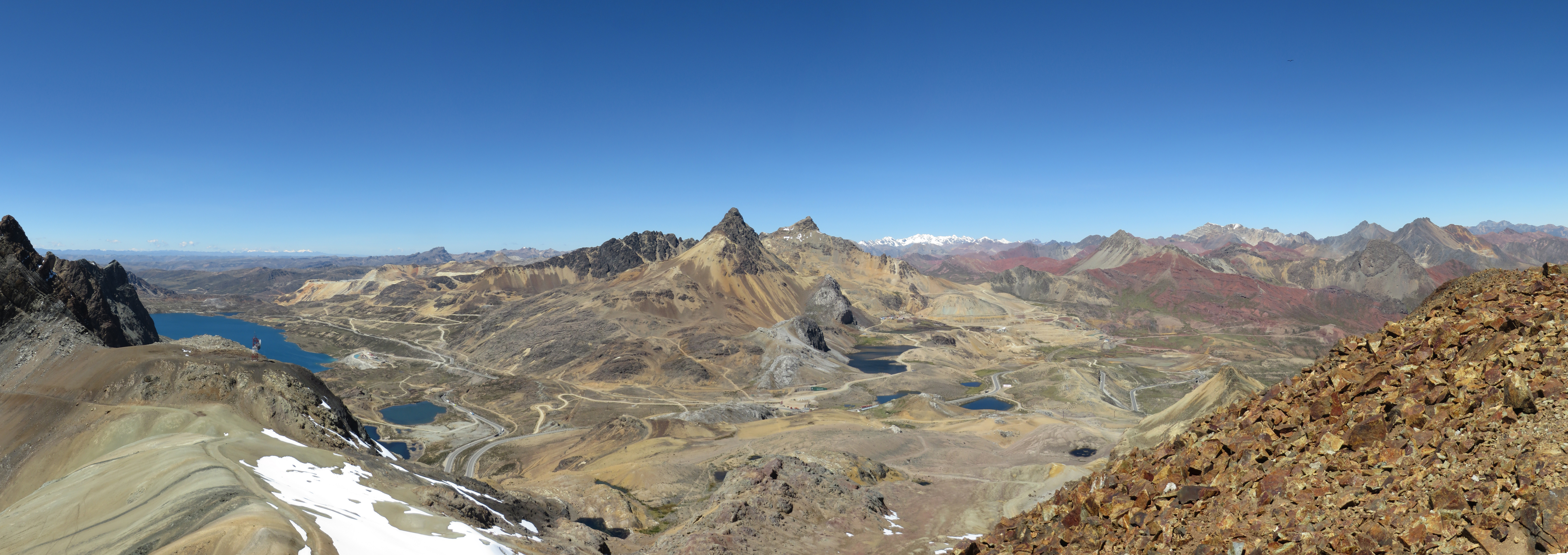
View from the summit of Yuraqqucha near the Antikuna pass
