= Gustaw Zemła =

Polish sculptor (born 1931)

Kazimierz Gustaw Zemła
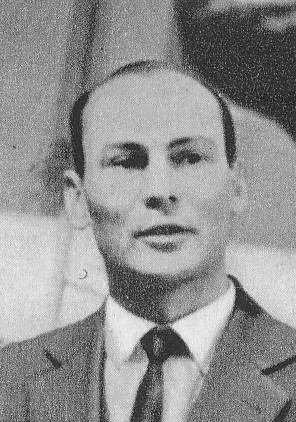
- Zemła in the 1960s.
- Born: 1 November 1931 (age 94); Jasienica Rosielna, Poland
- Education: Academy of Fine Arts
- Style: Sculpture

Kazimierz Gustaw Zemła (Note: Polish pronunciation: [kaˈʑi.mjɛʂ ˈɡus.taf ˈzɛm.wa]) (born 1 November 1931; Polish pronunciation: [ˈzɛm.wa]) is an artist, sculptor and academic. He is an author of numerous monuments, mostly located in Poland, and is one of the most recognisable sculptors of Poland.

== Biography ==
Kazimierz Gustaw Zemła was born on 1 November 1931, in the village of Jasienica Rosielna, now located in the Subcarpathian Voivodeship, Poland. From 1952 to 1958 he studied sculpture at the Academy of Fine Arts in Warsaw, Poland. In 1958 he was appointed as a professor there teaching sculpture. In 1964, he was appointed as the university director, and from 1973 to 1976 he was the prorector.

Since 2003, he has been a member of the Polish Academy of Arts and Sciences, and since 2006, a member of the programme council of the National Creative Work Centre foundation.

Zamła is the creator of many monuments, including the Monument of Silesian Insurgents (Katowice, 1967), Monument of the Fallen Undefeated (Warsaw, 1973), Monument to the Polish Endeavour (Szczecin, 1979), Monument of the Decalogue (Łódź, 1995), Henryk Sienkiewicz Monument (Warsaw, 1998), Ernest Malinowski Monument (Chicla District, 1999), and Monument to the Battle of Monte Cassino (Warsaw, 1999). He is also the author of numerous sculptures.

== Works ==
Picture	Year	Title	Location	Ref.
	1967	Silesian Insurgents Memorial	Katowice, Poland	
	1968	Karol Świerczewski Monument	Warsaw, Poland	
	1972	Monument to the Victims of the Fort III and World War II	Pomiechówek, Poland	
	1972	Władysław Broniewski Monument	Płock, Poland	
	1973	Monument of the Fallen Undefeated	Warsaw, Poland	
	1974	Ludwik Waryński Monument	Warsaw, Poland	
	1979	Monument to the Polish Endeavour	Szczecin, Poland	
	1991	John Paul II Monument	Kraków, Poland	
	1993	John Paul II Monument	Oleszyce, Poland	
	1993	John Paul II Monument	Płock, Poland	
	1994	John Paul II Monument	Łomża, Poland	
	1995	Monument of the Decalogue	Łódź, Poland	
	1998	Gravestone of Tony Halik at the Bródno Cemetery	Warsaw, Poland	
	1998	Henryk Sienkiewicz Monument	Warsaw, Poland	
	1998	John Paul II Monument	Montevideo, Uruguay	
	1999	Monument to the Battle of Monte Cassino	Warsaw, Poland	
	1999	Ernest Malinowski Monument	Chicla District, Department of Lima, Peru	
	2000	John Paul II Monument at St. Anne Mountain	Leśnica, Poland	
	2005	General Jerzy Ziętek Monument	Katowice, Poland	
	2006	Pope John Paul II Monument	Katowice, Poland	
	2007	Blessed Stefan Wincenty Frelichowski Monument	Toruń, Poland	
	2007	Pope John Paul II Monument	Suwałki, Poland	
	2008	John Paul II Monument at Wawel	Kraków, Poland	
	2010	Henryk Sienkiewicz Monument	Kielce, Poland	
	2011	Blessed Priest Jerzy Popiełuszko Monument	Toruń, Poland	
	2012	Henryk Sienkiewicz Monument	Toruń, Poland	

== Awards and orders ==
- Golden Honorary Badge of Merid of Warsaw (Poland, 1970)
- First Degree Award of the Minister of Culture and Art (Poland, 1973)
- First Degree State Award Badge (Poland, 1980)
- Commander's Cross with Star of the Order of Polonia Restituta (Poland, 1996)
- Grand Cross of the Order of Polonia Restituta (Poland, 2011)
- Medal of Merit of the City of Szczecin (Poland, 2012)
- Commander's Cross of the Order of Polonia Restituta (Poland)
- Grand Officer's Order of Metit (Sovereign Military Order of Malta)
- Honorary Badge of Pomeranian Griffin (Poland)
- Order of Merit for Distinguished Services (Peru)
