= Aar Dam =

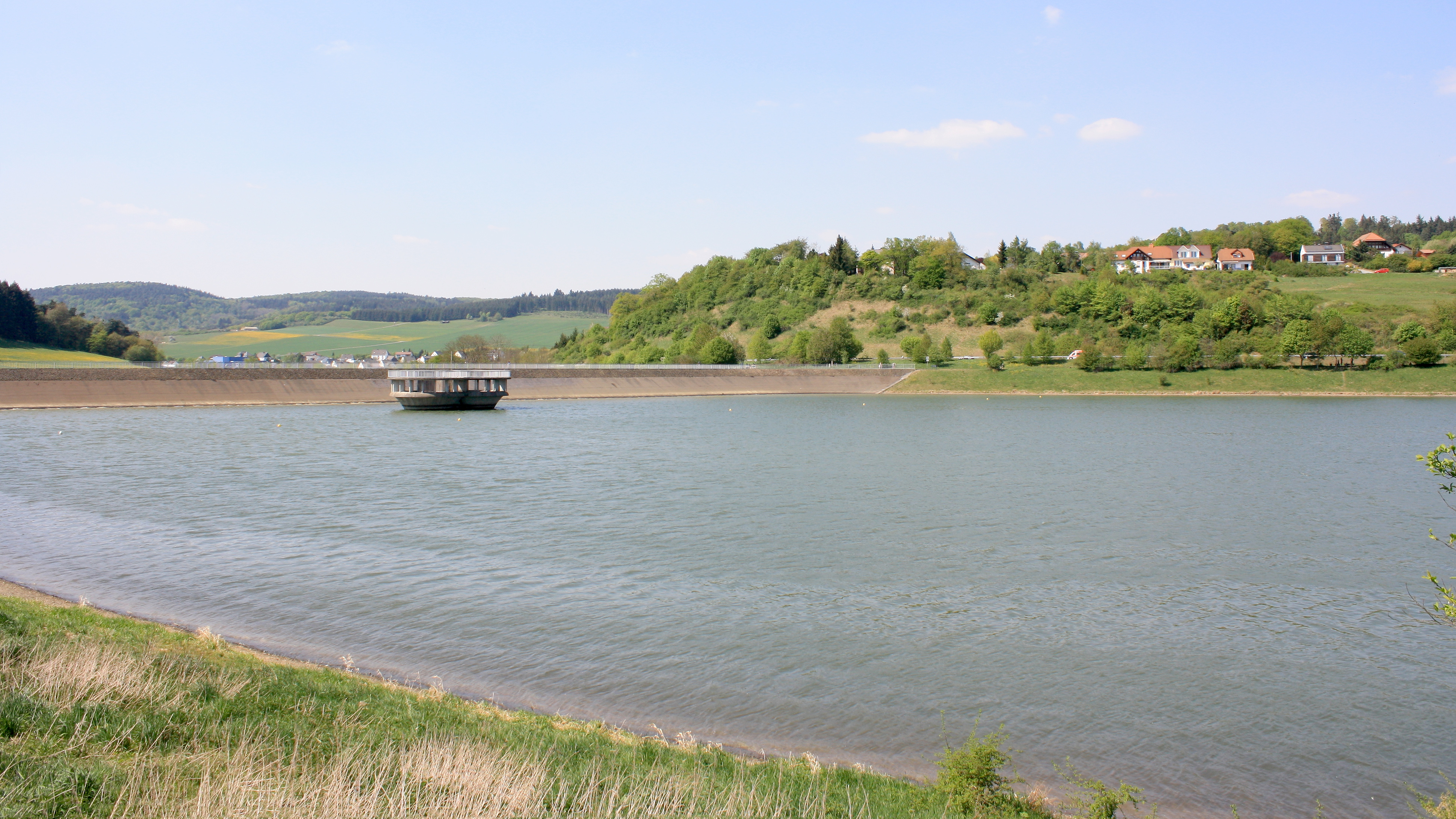
- The main dam and reservoir.

- Location within Germany
- Country: Germany
- Location: Lahn-Dill-Kreis
- Coordinates: 50°41′59″N 08°27′17″E
- Construction began: 1984
- Opening date: 1991

Dam and spillways
- Type of dam: Embankment, rock-fill
- Impounds: Aar
- Height (foundation): 15 m (49 ft)
- Height (thalweg): 14 m (46 ft)
- Length: 270 m (890 ft)
- Elevation at crest: 272.5 m (894 ft)
- Width (crest): 6 m (20 ft)
- Dam volume: 90,000 m^{3} (3,200,000 cu ft)
- Spillway capacity: 75 m^{3}/s (2,600 cu ft/s)

Reservoir
- Creates: Aartalsee
- Total capacity: 4,085,000 m^{3} (3,312 acre⋅ft)
- Catchment area: 60.5 km^{2} (23.4 sq mi)
- Surface area: 57 hectares (140 acres)
- Normal elevation: 270 m (890 ft)

Power Station
- Installed capacity: 0.25 MW (340 hp)

The Aar Dam and its reservoir, the Aartalsee, lie in the upper Aar valley in the German state of Hesse. Both are in the municipalities of Bischoffen and Hohenahr in the county of Lahn-Dill-Kreis and about 15 km northwest of the town of Gießen in Hesse. On the lakeshores lie the villages of Ahrdt and Mudersbach, both part of the parish of Hohenahr. Since 1991 the dam has impounded the River Aar, a left-hand tributary of the Dill in the Gladenbach Uplands. The reservoir is also fed by the Stadterbach, Wilsbach (into the forebay), Weidbach and Meerbach (into the main reservoir).

== Use ==
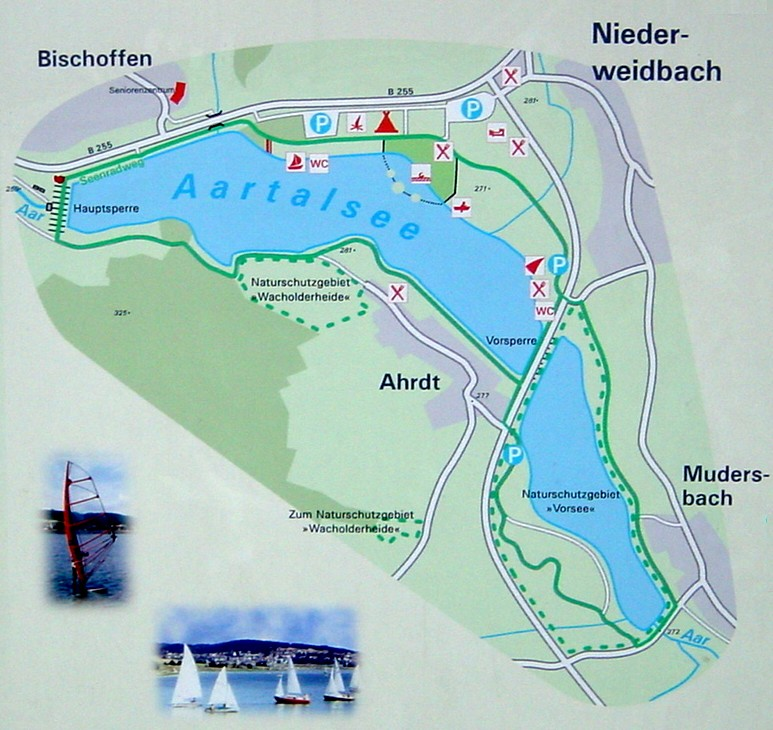
Site plan of the Aar Dam

The dam is primarily used for flood protection for the Aar and Dill. In Winter the reservoir is filled to a capacity of 1.33 million m^{3}; in summer this rises to 1.84 million m^{3}. Other uses are: raising low water levels, electricity generation, fishing and recreation. As a result, the dam and reservoir also contribute economically to the region. The reservoir was opened in 1992 as a bathing lake.

Its operator is the county council of Lahn-Dill-Kreis and the Dillgebeit Water Association.

== See also ==
- List of dams in Germany
