= Pilchowo =

Pilchowo may refer to the following places in north-west Poland:

- Pilchowo, Police County
- Pilchowo, Szczecin
