= Głębokie-Pilchowo =

Neighbourhood of Szczecin, Poland

- Administrative neighbourhood
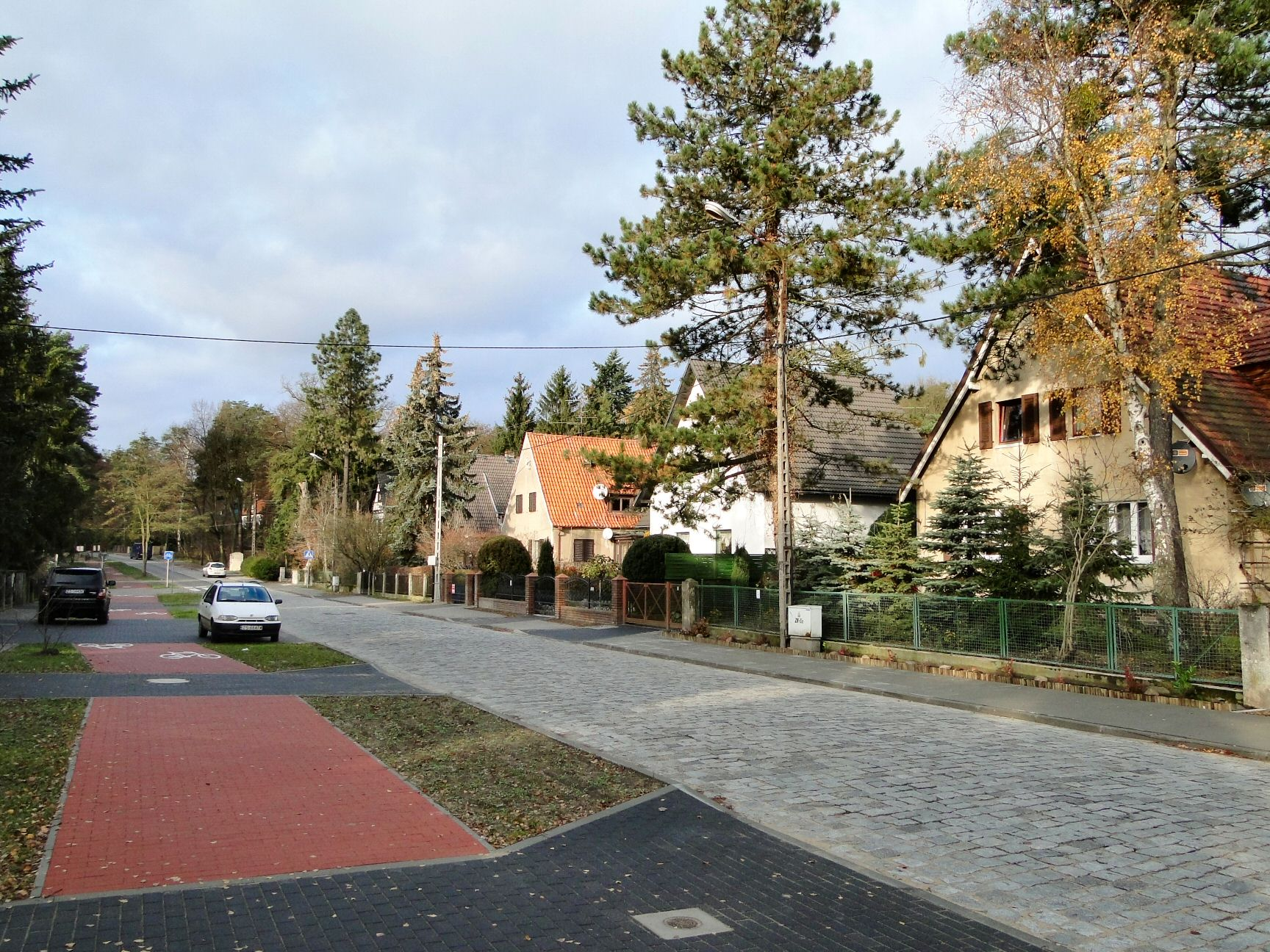
- The houses on Jaworowa Street in Głębokie.

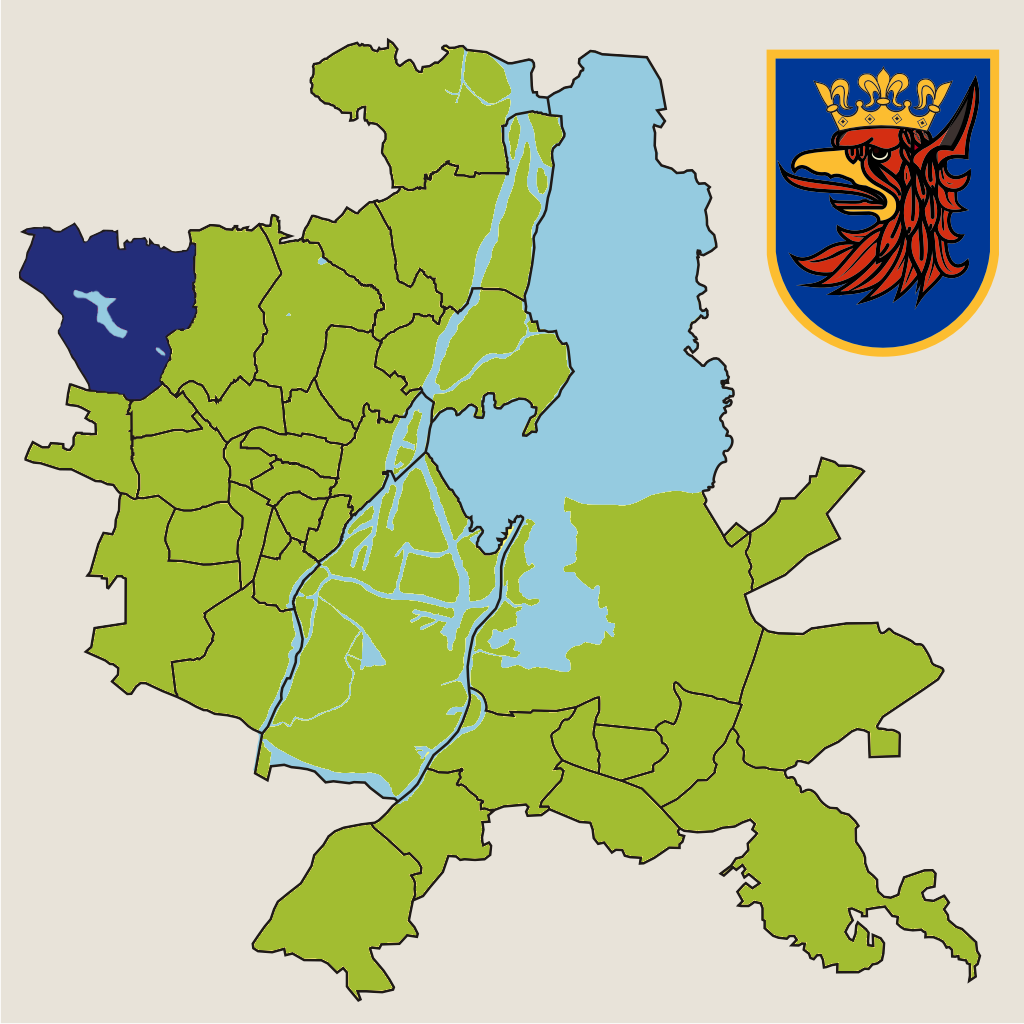
- The location of Głębokie within Szczecin.
- Coordinates: 53°28′37″N 14°29′00″E
- Country: Poland
- Voivodeship: West Pomeranian
- City and county: Szczecin
- District: West

Area
  - Total: 12.59 km^{2} (4.86 sq mi)

Population (2025)
  - Total: 1,075
- Time zone: UTC+1 (CET)
  - Summer (DST): UTC+2 (CEST)
- Area code: +48 91
- Car plates: ZS

Głębokie-Pilchowo (Polish: [ɡwɛmˈbɔ.kjɛ pilˈxɔ.vɔ]) is an administrative neighbourhood forming a subdivision of the West district in the city of Szczecin, Poland. The area features two small residential areas, consisting of single-family detached homes. It includes the neighbourhood of Głębokie, placed on the east coast of the Głębokie Lake, which has an area of 31,4 ha, and features a bathing beach complex. The other neighbourhood in the area is Pilchowo, placed to the north, at the city boundary. It borders the village of Pilchowo in Police County to the northwest. Majority of the area is covered by the Ueckermünde Heath. The neighbourhood has an area of 12.59 km^{2} (4.86 sq mi), and in 2025, was inhabited by 1075 people, making it the second least-populated administrative neighbourhood in the city.

The oldest found signs of human activity in the area date to the Neolithic era, while the first known human settlements were founded there in the 4th century CE, during the Bronze Age. The oldest known records of Głębokie, then a small hamlet, date to 1266, while Pilchowo was founded in the 13th century. The community operated seven gristmills alongside Osówka river, of which only one was preserved to the present day. In the 1930s, Głębokie was developed into a small suburb. Both Głębokie and Pilchowo were incorporated into the city in 1939. In 1945, the majority of the later settlement was again separated as a village, with only its southwest portion remaining under the city administration. The neighbourhood of Głębokie-Pilchowo was established in 1990.

== Toponomy ==
The name of the administrative subdivision comes from the names of its two neighbourhoods, Głębokie and Pilchowo. The former comes from the Polish word głębokie, a neuter nominative declination of adjective głęboki, meaning "deep". It comes from the name of the nearby Głębokie Lake (Polish: Jezioro Głębokie; lit. 'Deep Lake'). The name of Pilchowo comes from the Pomeranian-language nickname Polch or Płch, which comes from the Pomeranian word płch, meaning "rat". With addition of the suffix -owo, it came to mean "Polch's place".

== History ==
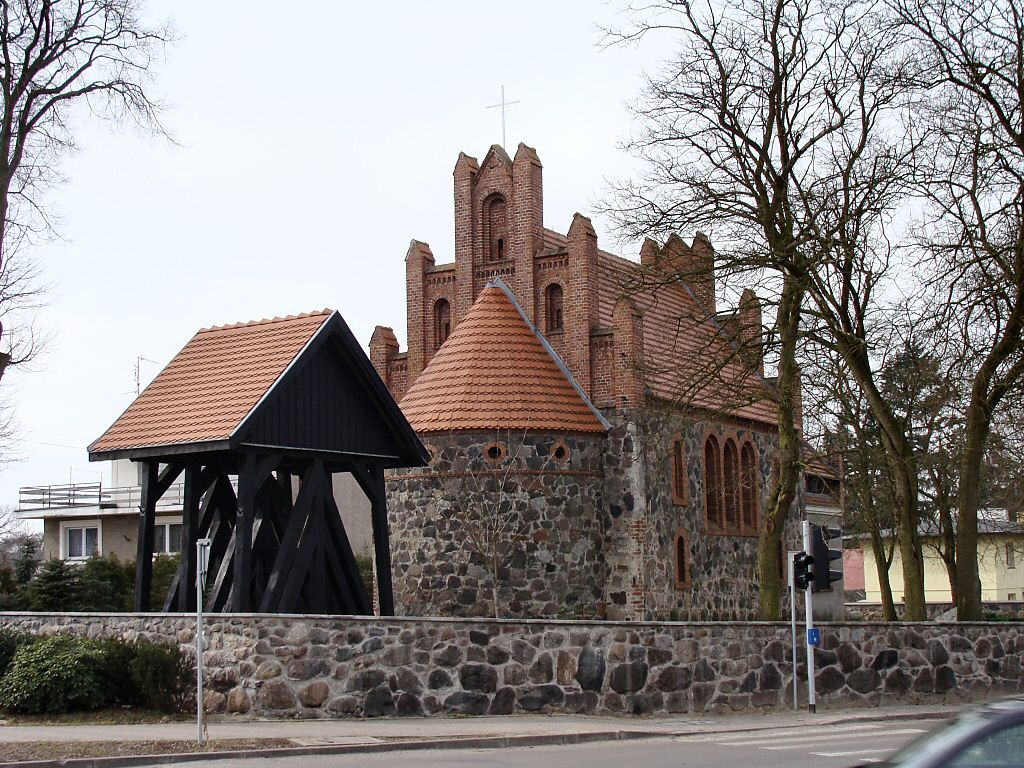
The Church of the Assumption of the Blessed Virgin Mary in Pilchowo, built at the turn of the 14th century. Currently located outside the city boundaries.

Pieces of ceramics and axes, dating to the Neolithic era, the Funnelbeaker culture, and the Comb Ceramic culture, were discovered within the area of the modern neighbourhood of Głębokie-Pilchowo. The first permanent human settlements were founded in the area in the 4th and 5th centuries CE, during the Bronze Age. Artifacts dating to between 10th and 11th to 12th centuries, were also discovered. A piece of a scull of a male aurochs with an antler, dated at around 9,700 years, was also discovered in a peatland near Pilchowo.

The oldest known records of Głębokie (German: Glambeck) date to 1266, when duke Barnim I granted the ownership of a half of the village to the St. Mary Church in Szczecin (Stettin). In 1342, the entire settlement became its property, with the village being exempted from taxation and duties. The village was placed on the coast of the Głębokie Lake. In the 13th century, the village of Pilchowo (Polchow) was founded in the 13th century, to the north of Głębokie, as a small farming community. At the turn of the 14th century, the village became property of the Duke of Pomerania, and begun selling its farm products on large scale to the nearby city of Szczecin (Stettin).

In the Early Middle Ages, seven gristmills were built alongside the Osówka stream, located to the east of Głębokie and north of Osów (Wussow), and characterised by its strong current. The oldest mention of them come from 1277, when one of the mills was sold to the city by duke Barnim I. The rest of them were also bought by Szczecin in 1643. In 1418, to improve their output, dukes Otto II and Casimir IV issued permission to channel the water from Osówka into the Głębokie Lake. In the 19th century, the gristmills were refitted with steam engines, and later with diesel and electric engines. All but one of the Osów mills were demolished sometime after in 1945, leaving behind a series of small lakes, with the area being now known as the Seven Mills Valley.

Around that time, a church building, made from granite bricks, was built in the village, now being known as the Church of the Assumption of the Blessed Virgin Mary. It was rebuilt and expanded in the second half of the 19th century, in a Romanesque Revival style. Originally belonging to the Roman Catholic denomination, it was changed to the Lutheranism in the 16th century during the Protestant Reformation. It was again changed to Roman Catholism in 1949.

In 1590, the village became the property of the Ramin family which was part of the aristocracy of Western Pomerania. In the 19th century, the Głębokie Lake and its surroundings became a popular recreational and hiking area, while Głębokie became a holiday village. In the 1920s, a bathing beach complex was opened at the Głębokie Lake.

In the 1930s, the owner of Głębokie, Barnim von Ramin, partitioned his land, with an area of 76 ha for the development on a villa suburb. In 1932, he entered into an agreement with the city of Szczecin, approving the creation of the suburb, with the city being designated to inherit the land after Ramin's death. The urban layout was designed by Berlin-based architect Heinrich Zeller. It was approved in 1931, and later updated by Zeller in 1935. The neighbourhood was developed on the coast of the Głębokie Lake, and to the east of Zagadłowicza Street, and consisted of single-family detached homes. It was developed in phases, with last two, the fourth and fifth phases, not being constructed due to the outbreak of the Second World War in 1939.

On 15 October 1939, the area including Głębokie and Pichliwo was incorporated into the city of Szczecin. It was captured by the Red Army of the Soviet Union on 26 April 1945, during the Second World War. The city was placed under the Polish administration on 5 July 1945, while its suburbs, including Głębokie and Pichliwo were placed under Soviet military occupation. The areas were returned under the Polish control on 4 October 1945. Głębokie was incorporated back into the city, while the majority of Pilchowo remained as a separate village. The exception was its small southwest portion, located to the south of the Veletian Stream, and to the west of Zegadłowicza Street, was incorporated back into the city, under the name of Pilchowo. The Church of the Assumption of the Blessed Virgin Mary remained within the village of Pilchowo.

In 1955, a tram tracks were built alongside Polish Armed Forces Avenue, connecting Głębokie with the rest of the city. It ended with a turning loop placed at the corner of Polish Armed Forces Avenue and Miodowa Street.

From 1955 to 1976, the neighbourhood of Głębokie formed one of the administrative subdivisions of the Nad Odrą district. It also included the neighbourhood of Pilchowo. In 1960, the area had the population of 1,456 people. On 28 November 1990, the neighbourhood of Głębokie-Pilchowo was established as one of the administrative subdivisions of the West district, being governed by an elected neighbourhood council. It incorporated the neighbourhoods of Głębokie and Pilchowo.

In the 1960s, the military barracks were built at 250 Polish Armed Forces Avenue, in place of a former military training area dating to the 19th century. Since 1996, they house the 12th Mechanised Brigade of the 12th Mechanised Division, a unit of the Polish Land Forces.

Also in the 1960s, several dozen new single-family housing developments were constructed in the neighbourhood. In the 1970s, an artificial lake, named the Fishing Pond, was dug out to the southeast of the neighbourhood of Głębokie, originally being crossed thought by the Osówka stream. Between 1989 and 1995, the St. Brother Albert Church, which belongs to the Roman Catholic denomination, was constructed at 20 Zegadłowicza Street in Głębokie.

== Characteristics ==
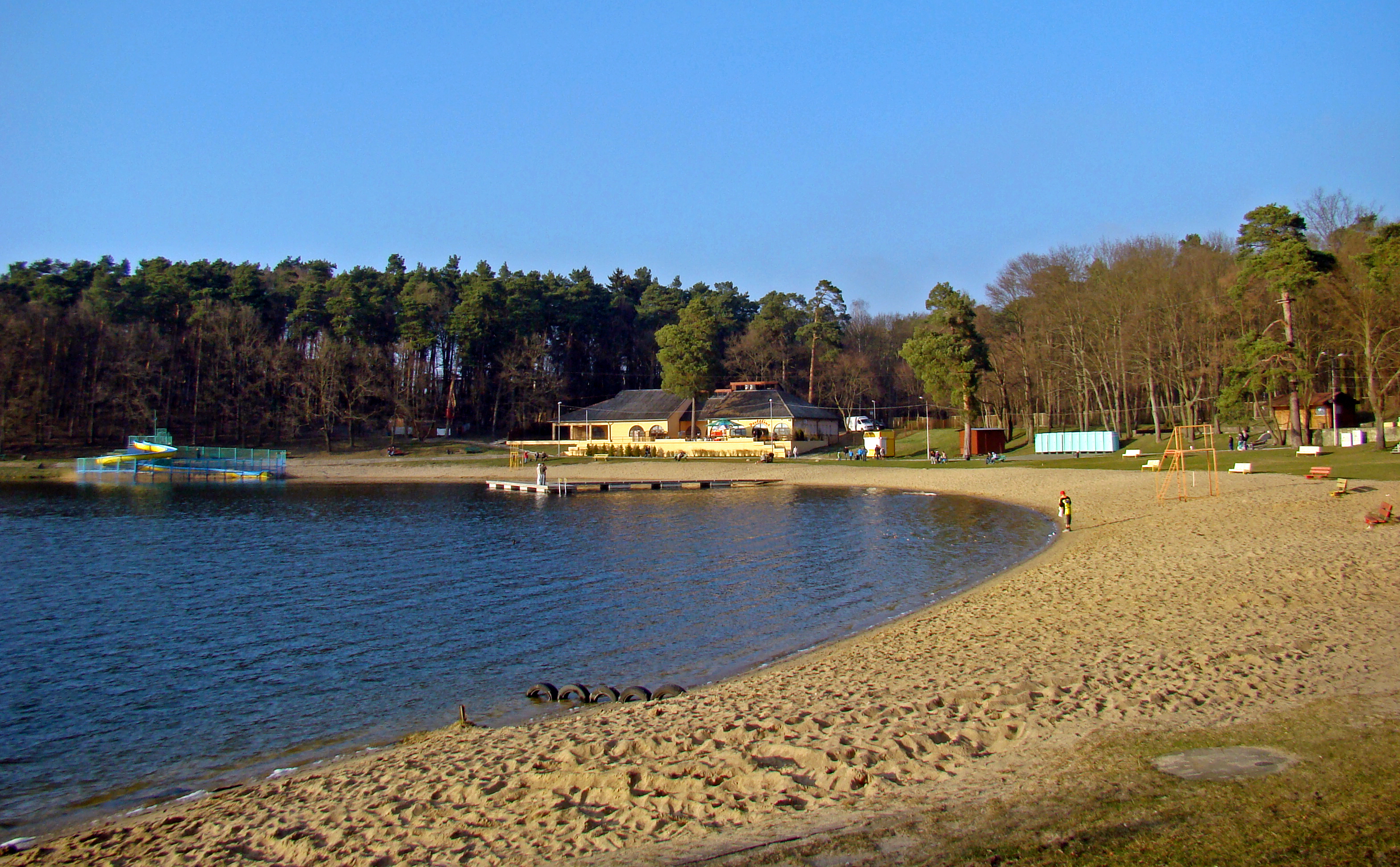
A beach at the Głębokie Lake.

The area features two small residential areas, consisting of single-family detached homes. In the centre, it features the neighbourhood of Głębokie, placed to the east of Zegadłowicza Street, in the area of Jaworowa, Majowa, and Pogodna Streets. Majority of its buildings date to the 1930s and the 1960s. It is located on the east coast of the Głębokie Lake, which has an area of 31,4 ha, and features a bathing beach complex. A small artificial lake, known as the Fishing Pond, is also located to its southeast. Głębokie also features St. Brother Albert Church, which belongs to the Roman Catholic denomination. In the north, the area also features the neighbourhood of Pilchowo, placed alongside Zegadłowicza Street, at the city boundary. To the north, it borders the village of Pilchowo in Police County. Their boundary is marked by the Veletian Stream to the north, and Zegadłowicza Street to the east. In the south, the area also includes the barracks of the 12th Mechanised Brigade of the 12th Mechanised Division, a unit of the Polish Land Forces, located at 250 Polish Armed Forces Avenue. The neighbourhood of Głębokie is also connected by the tracks with the municipal tram network. They are placed alongside Polish Armed Forces Avenue, and end with a turning loop at the corner with Miodowa Street.

The area is placed on the Warszewo Hills, and features the Pichlówka stream and the Veletian Stream flowing in its north, and the Arkonka, Jasmundzka Struga, Kijanka, Osówka, and Żabiniec streams flowing in its east. In the southeast it features the Głuszec, and Goplana Lakes. The former is fed by Arkonka and Osówka streams, and the later, by Żabiniec stream. The majority of the area is covered by Ueckermünde Heath, with its parts forming the Arkona Forest Park in the east, and Głębokie Forest Park in the west. The area alongside the Osówka stream with seven small ponds, located to the east of the neighbourhood of Głębokie, is known as the Seven Mills Valley, after seven gristmills which were present alongside it between 13th and 20th centuries. One of the historic points is preserved to the present day.

== Demographics ==
Historical population
Year	2008	2009	2010	2011	2012	2013	2014	2015	2016	2017	2018	2019	2020	2021	2022	2023	2024	2025
Pop.	1,272	1,255	1,219	1,202	1,230	1,234	1,223	1,223	1,229	1,226	1,199	1,163	1,150	1,129	1,104	1,081	1,084	1,075
±%	—	−1.3%	−2.9%	−1.4%	+2.3%	+0.3%	−0.9%	+0.0%	+0.5%	−0.2%	−2.2%	−3.0%	−1.1%	−1.8%	−2.2%	−2.1%	+0.3%	−0.8%

== Government and boundaries ==
Głębokie-Pilchowo is one of the administrative neighbourhoods forming a subdivision of the West district in the city of Szczecin, Poland. It is governed by a locally elected neighbourhood council with 15 members. Its headquarters are located at 49 Pogodna Street. Its boundaries are approximately determined by the city boundary, Zegadłowicza Street, Pod Urwiskiem Street, Miodowa Street, Polish Armed Forces Avenue, Jarzyńskiego Street, and the border with the neighbourhood of Osów. Głębokie-Pilchowo borders the neighbourhoods of Osów, Krzekowo-Bezrzecze, and Zawadzkiego-Klonowica, as well as Police County, with the villages of Pilchowo in the municipality of Police, and Bezrzecze and Wołczkowo in the municipality of Dobra Szczecińska. The neighbourhood has the total area of 12.59 km^{2} (4.86 sq mi).
