= Friedhelm Loh =

German billionaire businessman (born 1946)

- Born: 16 August 1946 (age 79)
- Occupations: Chairman, Friedhelm Loh Group
- Spouse: married
- Children: 3

Friedhelm Loh (born 16 August 1946) is a German billionaire businessman. He is the founder and chairman of the Friedhelm Loh Group, a group of companies that grew out of a business he inherited from his father.

== Career ==
Loh's father Rudolf founded a company in 1961 that offered "the first mass-produced enclosures for electrical control systems". Friedhelm took over the running of the business in 1974, renamed it Rittal and developed the Friedhelm Loh Group around it, a group of companies that offer goods and services ranging through sheet steel, electrical enclosures such as computer server cabinets, plastic components for automotive and other industries, software for computer assisted planning of complex electrical systems and industrial workflow consultancy. Friedhelm Loh is owner and chairman of the group.

From 2006 to 2014, Loh served as president of the Association of the Electrical and Digital Industry (ZVEI).

In July 2021, Forbes estimated Loh's net worth at US$9.7 billion.

== Recognition ==
- Rudolf Diesel Medal (2010)

== Personal life ==
Loh is married, has three children and lives in Haiger, Germany.

Loh is a collector of automobiles and in 2023 founded the National Automobile Museum in Dietzhöltal, Germany to allow public access to many vehicles from his personal collection supplemented by seasonal exhibits on varying themes.
