= Wümbach =

Wümbach may refer to:

- Wümbach, Ilmenau, a former municipality, today part of the town Ilmenau in Thuringia, Germany
- Wümbach (Ilm), a river of Thuringia, Germany, tributary of the Ilm
