= Langenaubach =

- Stadtteil of Haiger
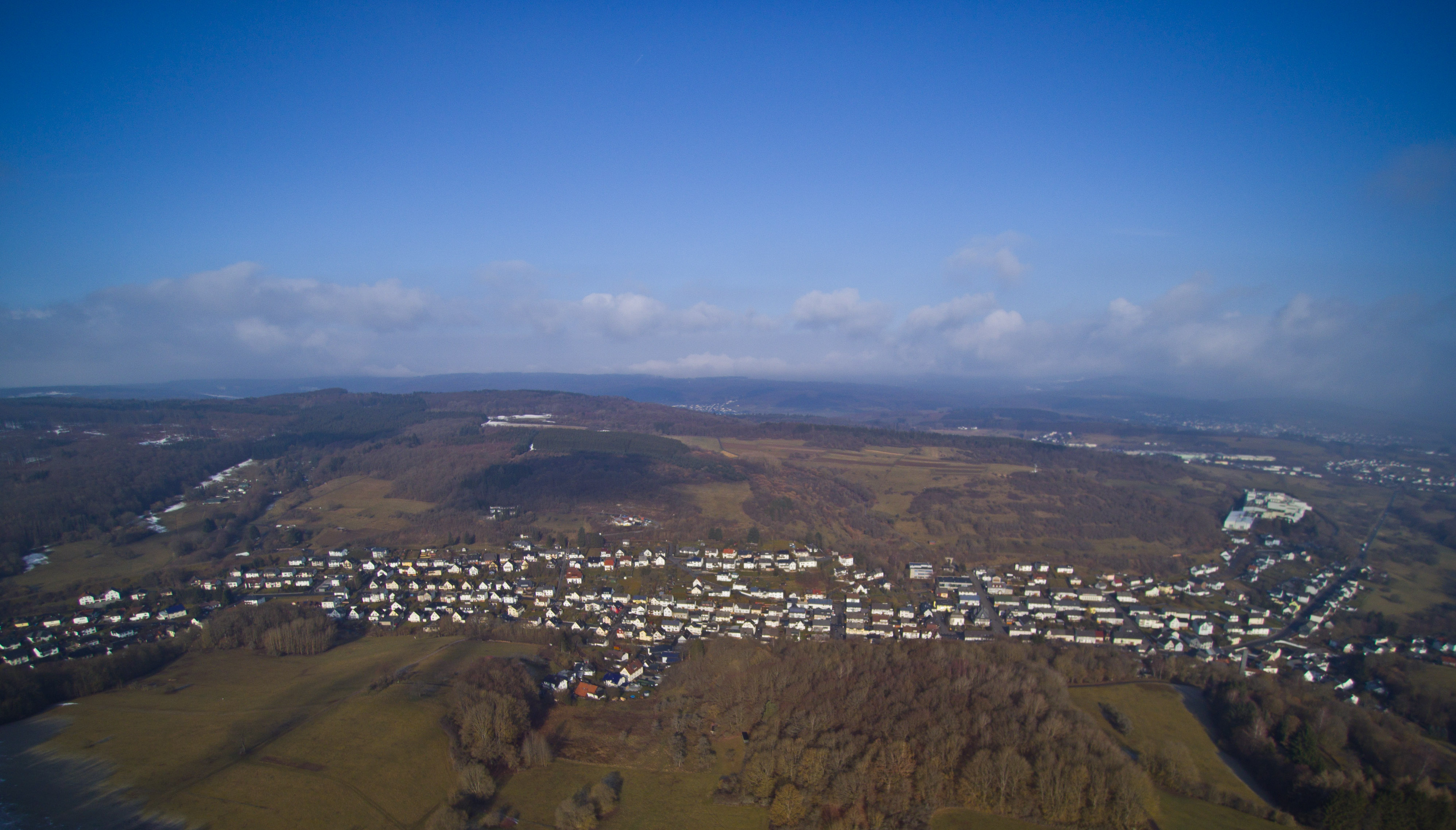
- Langenaubach from above

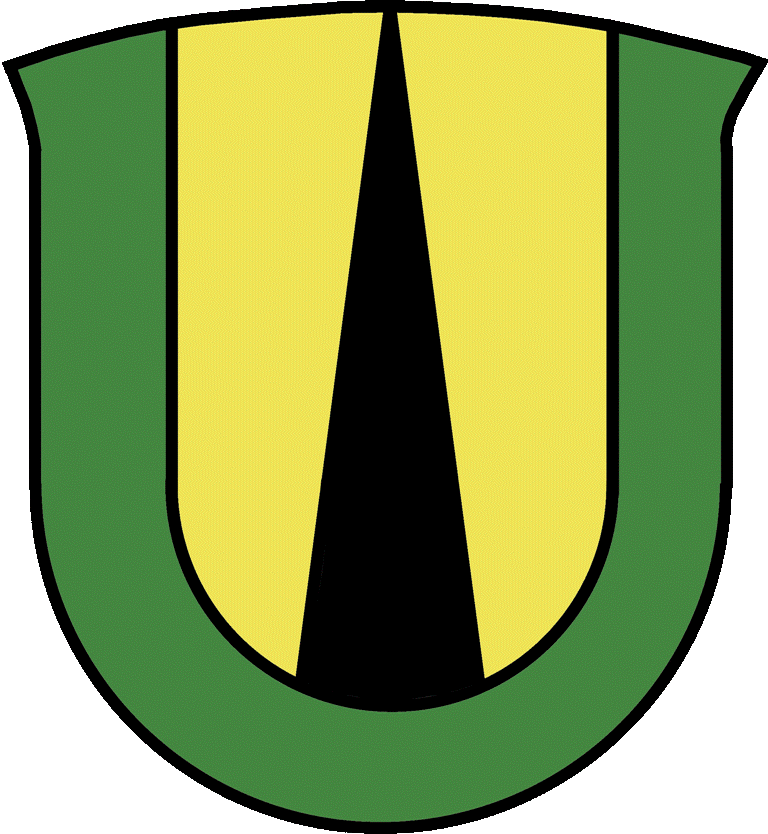
- Coat of arms
- Interactive map of Langenaubach
- Location within Germany Location within Hesse
- Coordinates: 50°42′58″N 8°1′02″E
- Country: Germany
- State: Hesse
- Admin. region: Gießen
- District: Lahn-Dill-Kreis
- Town: Haiger

Area
  - Total: 9.87 km^{2} (3.81 sq mi)
- Elevation: 360 m (1,180 ft)

Population (2017-12-31)
  - Total: 1,631
  - Density: 165/km^{2} (428/sq mi)
- Time zone: UTC+01:00 (CET)
  - Summer (DST): UTC+02:00 (CEST)
- Postal codes: 35708
- Dialling codes: 02773
- Vehicle registration: LDK

Langenaubach is a village and a Stadtteil of Haiger in the Lahn-Dill-Kreis district in Hesse in Germany.

There are 1,631 inhabitants, of which 65% are Protestant and 10% are Catholic (2017). There was a mine called "Constanze" in Langenaubach

== Geography ==
=== Location ===
Langenaubach lies about 3 km south of Haiger, and approx. 20 km southeast of Siegen on the eastern edge of the Westerwald range, near where the three states of Hesse, North Rhine-Westphalia and Rhineland-Palatinate all share a common point. The brook Aubach flows through this village.

=== Neighbouring communities ===
To the Northwest Langenaubach borders with the villages of Oberdresselndorf and Niederdresselndorf, to the North with the town of Haiger and the village of Flammersbach, to the East with the village of Donsbach, to the Southeast with the village of Medenbach, to the South with the village of Breitscheid, to the Southwest with the village of Rabenscheid.
