= Veletian Mountain =

Hill in Police County, Poland

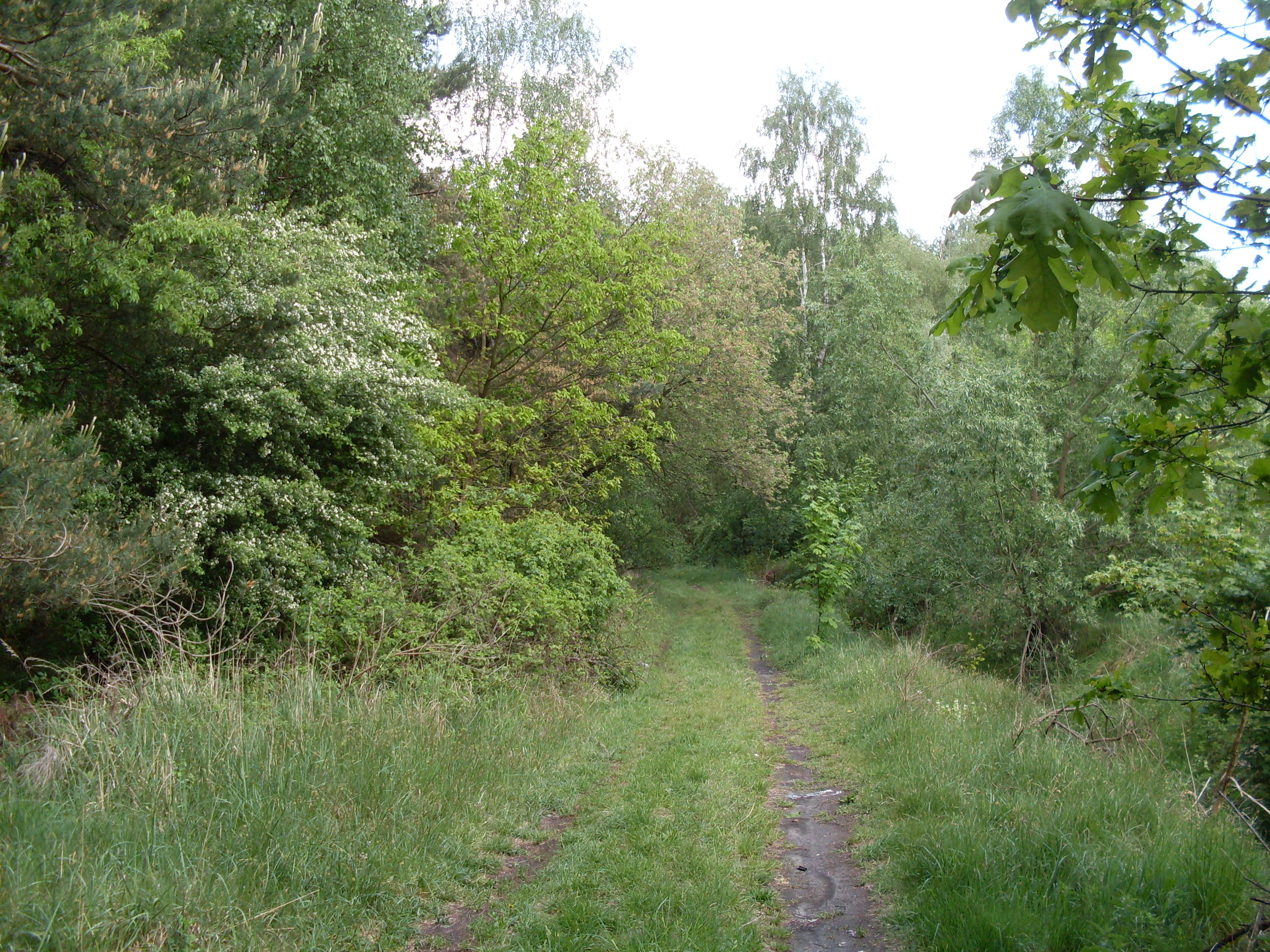
- A dirt road on the Veletian Mountain.

Highest point
- Elevation: 130.9 m (429 ft)
- Coordinates: 53°29′46″N 14°31′53″E

Geography
- Country: Poland
- Voivodeship: West Pomeranian Voivodeship
- County: Police County
- Municipality: Police

The Veletian Mountain (Polish: Wielecka Góra) is a moraine hill near the boundary of the city of Szczecin, Poland, located within the municipality of Police in Police County. With the height of 130.9 m (429.46 ft), it is the tallest peak of the Warszewo Hills. It is located within the Ueckermünde Heath.

== Toponomy ==
The hill is named after the Veleti, a group of medieval Lechitic tribes related to Polabian Slavs, which inhabited the area from the 8th to 10th centauries.

== Characteristics ==
Veletian Mountain is the tallest peak of the Warszewo Hills, with the height of 130.9 m (429.46 ft). It is placed near the boundary of the Szczecin, Poland, within the municipality of Police in Police County. It is a moraine hill, located within the Ueckermünde Heath. The Devil's Marsh is present at its base, forming the source of the Veletian Stream. Previously, in the area of the hill was present the village of Goślice, which was abandoned after the Second World War.
