= Lemp (Dill) =

River in Germany

Location
- Country: Germany
- State: Hesse

Physical characteristics
- Mouth
  - location: Dill
  - coordinates: 50.5974°N 8.3814°E
- Length: 11.6 km (7.2 mi)

Basin features
- Progression: Dill→ Lahn→ Rhine→ North Sea

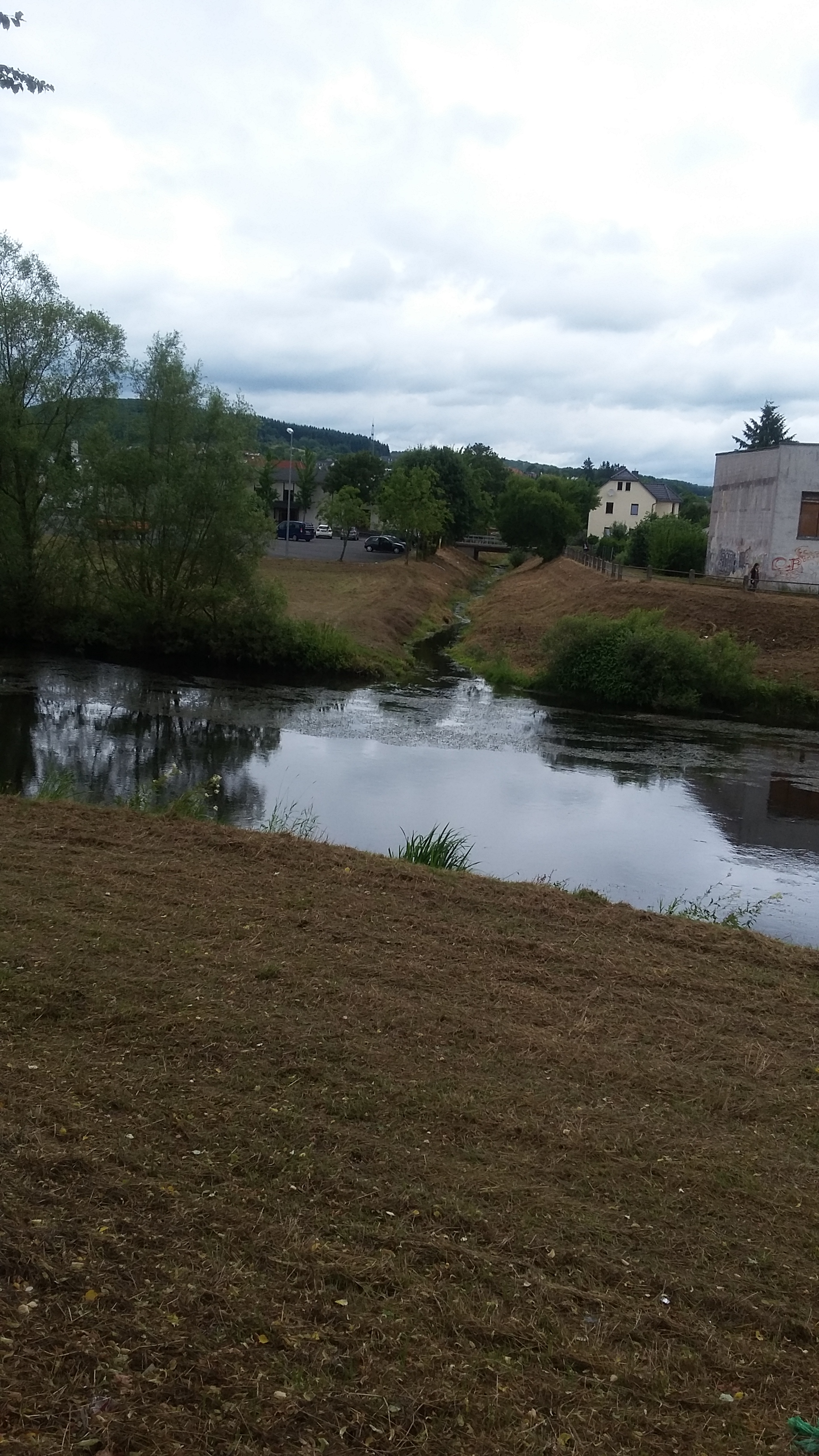
Lemp Estuary

Lemp is a river of Hesse, Germany. It flows into the Dill in Ehringshausen.

== See also ==
- List of rivers of Hesse
