= Rittal =

Manufacturer of industrial parts

Friedhelm Loh Group
- Founded: 1961
- Founder: Rudolf Loh
- Headquarters: Herborn, Hesse, Germany
- Revenue: €2.5 billion (2021)
- Owner: Friedhelm Loh
- Parent: Friedhelm Loh Group
- Website: rittal.com

Rittal is a German manufacturer of electrical enclosures for use in industrial settings. Founded in 1961, Rittal is a subsidiary of the Friedhelm Loh Group. The name Rittal is derived from the place where the company was founded – Rittershausen in Dietzhölztal. The company headquarters is in Herborn.

== Products ==
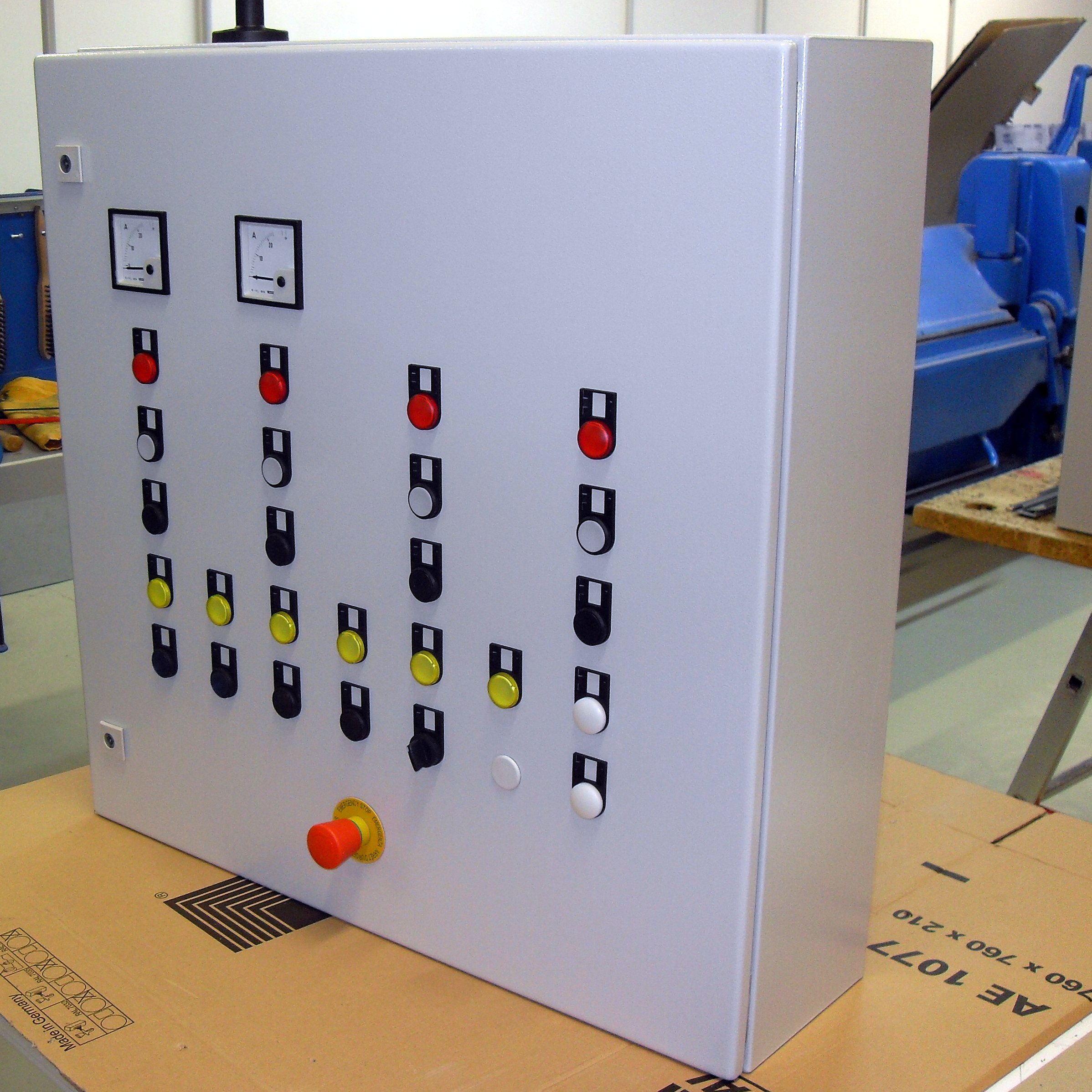
Industrial operation board in Rittal enclosure

Rittal is a German provider of industrial enclosure systems including power distribution and climate control as well as for IT infrastructure and software and services. Enclosures from Rittal are used in:

- Electrical engineering and automation
- Renewable energies
- Information technology
- Infrastructure
- Mechanical engineering
- Transport technology

== Locations ==
This list contains the Rittal sales locations worldwide. The production sites are highlighted in blue.

Rittal worldwide locations
Region	Country	Cities
Europe	Albania	Tirana
Europe	Austria	Lauterach
Europe	Austria	Linz
Europe	Austria	Seiersberg
Europe	Austria	Vienna
Europe	Belarus	Minsk
Europe	Belgium	Lokeren
Europe	Bosnia	Banja Luka
Europe	Bosnia	Mostar
Europe	Bosnia	Sarajevo
Europe	Bulgaria	Sofia
Europe	Croatia	Zagreb
Europe	Czech Republic	Zdiby
Europe	Denmark	Vallensbæk Strand
Europe	Estonia	Tallinn
Europe	Finland	Vantaa
Europe	France	Paris
Europe	Germany	Bad Krozingen
Europe	Germany	Bietigheim-Bissingen
Europe	Germany	Burbach
Europe	Germany	Dietzhölztal-Rittershausen
Europe	Germany	Eschenburg-Wissenbach
Europe	Germany	Essen
Europe	Germany	Garching
Europe	Germany	Gera
Europe	Germany	Haiger
Europe	Germany	Herborn
Europe	Germany	Hof
Europe	Germany	Quickborn
Europe	Germany	Quierschied
Europe	Germany	Rennerod
Europe	Greece	Athens
Europe	Hungary	Budapest
Europe	Iceland	Reykjavík
Europe	Ireland	Carlow
Europe	Italy	Valeggio sul Mincio
Europe	Italy	Pioltello
Europe	Latvia	Riga
Europe	Lithuania	Vilnius
Europe	Luxembourg	Ehlerange
Europe	North Macedonia	Skopje
Europe	Montenegro	Podgorica
Europe	Netherlands	Zevenaar
Europe	Norway	Ski
Europe	Poland	Warsaw
Europe	Portugal	Rio Meão
Europe	Romania	Otopeni
Europe	Russia	Moscow
Europe	Serbia	Belgrade
Europe	Slovakia	Bratislava
Europe	Slovenia	Ljubljana
Europe	Spain	Barcelona
Europe	Sweden	Ängelholm
Europe	Switzerland	Neuenhof
Europe	Switzerland	Yverdon-les-Bains
Europe	Turkey	Istanbul
Europe	Ukraine	Kyiv
Europe	United Kingdom	Hellaby
Europe	United Kingdom	Plymouth
Asia-Pacific	Australia	Miranda
Asia-Pacific	China	Hong Kong
Asia-Pacific	China	Shanghai
Asia-Pacific	India	Bengaluru
Asia-Pacific	India	Doddaballapur
Asia-Pacific	Indonesia	Jakarta
Asia-Pacific	Japan	Yokohama
Asia-Pacific	Kazakhstan	Almaty
Asia-Pacific	Malaysia	Selangor
Asia-Pacific	New Zealand	Wellington
Asia-Pacific	Philippines	Makati
Asia-Pacific	Singapore	Singapore
Asia-Pacific	South Korea	Busan
Asia-Pacific	South Korea	Incheon
Asia-Pacific	Taiwan	Taipei
Asia-Pacific	Thailand	Bangkok
Asia-Pacific	Vietnam	Ho Chi Minh City
North America	Canada	Mississauga
North America	Mexico	Mexico City
North America	USA	Schaumburg
North America	USA	Urbana
Central America	Costa Rica	Heredia
Central America	El Salvador	San Salvador
Central America	Guatemala	Guatemala City
Central America	Honduras	San Pedro Sula
Central America	Nicaragua	Managua
Central America	Trinidad and Tobago	San Fernando
South America	Argentina	Buenos Aires
South America	Bolivia	Santa Cruz de la Sierra
South America	Brazil	São Paulo
South America	Chile	Las Condes
South America	Colombia	Bogotá
South America	Peru	Lima
South America	Venezuela	Caracas
Middle East/Africa	Israel	Caesarea
Middle East/Africa	Nigeria	Lagos
Middle East/Africa	South Africa	Johannesburg
Middle East/Africa	United Arab Emirates	Dubai

== Sponsorships ==
Rittal sponsors a number of football and handball clubs in the region, including HSG Wetzlar. From March 2006 until the end of 2021, the company sponsored the Mittelhessen-Arena in Wetzlar as the Rittal Arena Wetzlar. Rittal was also a major sponsor of Hessentag 2016 in Herborn.
