= Aubach (Dill) =

River in Hesse, Germany

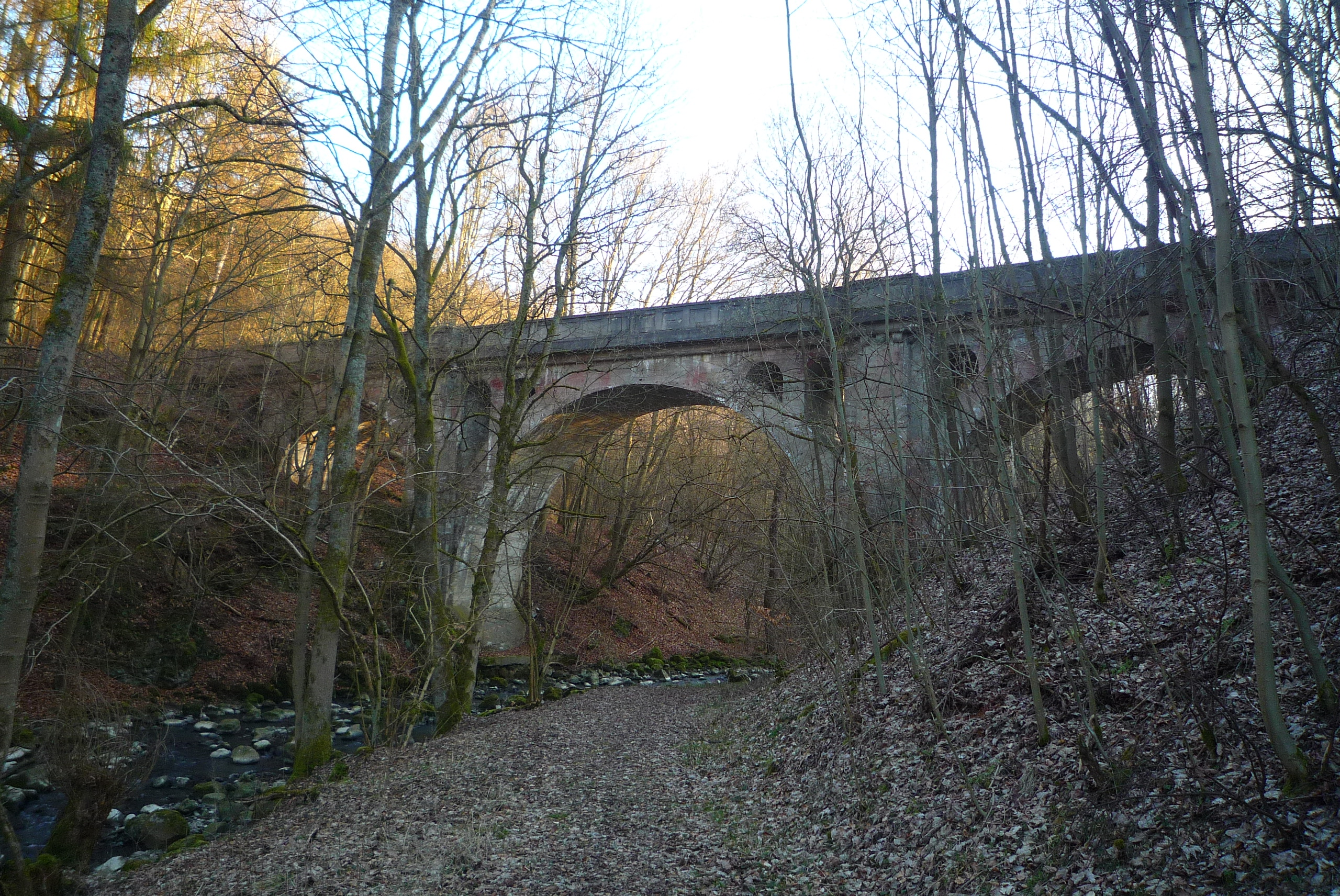

- Location of mouth in Hesse

Location
- Country: Germany
- State: Hesse

Physical characteristics
- Mouth
  - location: Dill
  - coordinates: 50.7475°N 8.2158°E
- Length: 16 km (9.9 mi)

Basin features
- Progression: Dill→ Lahn→ Rhine→ North Sea

The Aubach is a river of Hesse, Germany and tributary of the Dill. It join the Dill on the right bank in Haiger.

== See also ==
- List of rivers of Hesse
