= Friedhelm Loh Group =

German manufacturing and services conglomerate

- Founded: 1961
- Founder: Rudolf Loh
- Headquarters: Haiger, Germany
- Revenue: $2.5 billion (2021)
- Owner: Friedhelm Loh
- Number of employees: more than 11,600
- Subsidiaries: Rittal
- Website: www.friedhelm-loh-group.com

Friedhelm Loh Group is a German manufacturing and services group headed by Friedhelm Loh. It is headquartered in Haiger, Germany and has offices and production centres worldwide.

Friedhelm Loh Group grew out of a business founded in 1961 by Friedhelm's father Rudolf Loh that manufactured and sold the "first mass-produced enclosures for electrical control systems".

The group employs more than 11,600 people (2021) and generates revenues of € 2.5 billion (2021). Major companies in the Group include Rittal, EPLAN, Cideon, LKH and Stahlo.

== Companies within the Group ==
Companies in the group and their products include:

- Rittal: enclosures for electrical and electronic equipment, power distribution systems, IT infrastructure, software and services
- Stahlo: steel products and services
- EPLAN: Computer Aided Engineering (CAE) software
- LKH: plastic components for electrical assemblies in automotive, manufacturing and construction sectors
- Cideon: engineering process consultancy services
- Digital Technology Poland: software and hardware Research & Development
- Loh Services: services for other companies within the group, such as IT and HR
