= Schelde (Dill) =

River in Germany

Location
- Country: Germany
- State: Hesse

Physical characteristics
- Mouth
  - location: Dill
  - coordinates: 50.7188°N 8.3043°E
- Length: 12.0 km (7.5 mi)

Basin features
- Progression: Dill→ Lahn→ Rhine→ North Sea

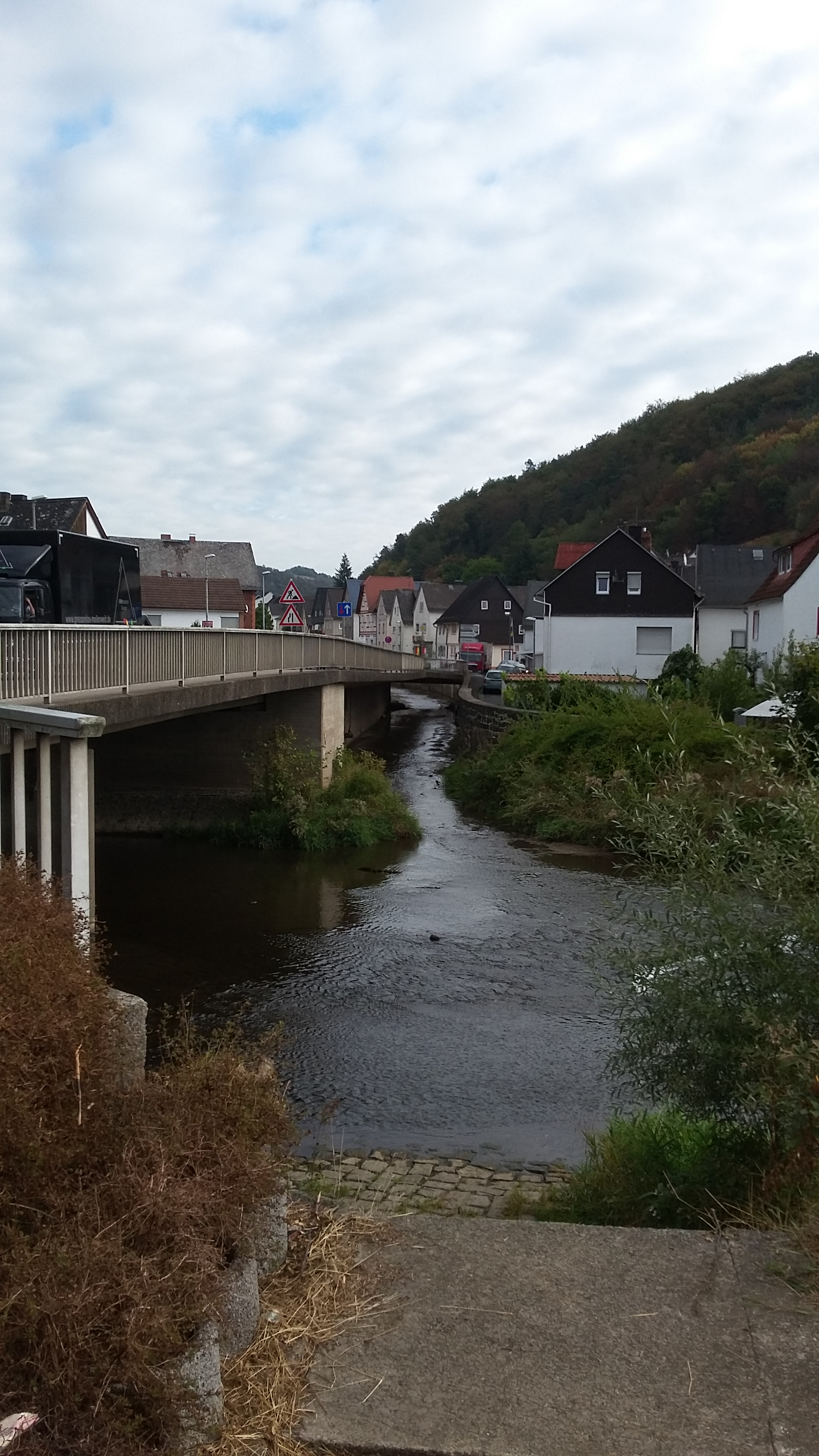
Schelde River

Schelde is a river of Hesse, Germany. It flows into the Dill near Dillenburg.

== See also ==
- List of rivers of Hesse
