= Wümbach (Ilm) =

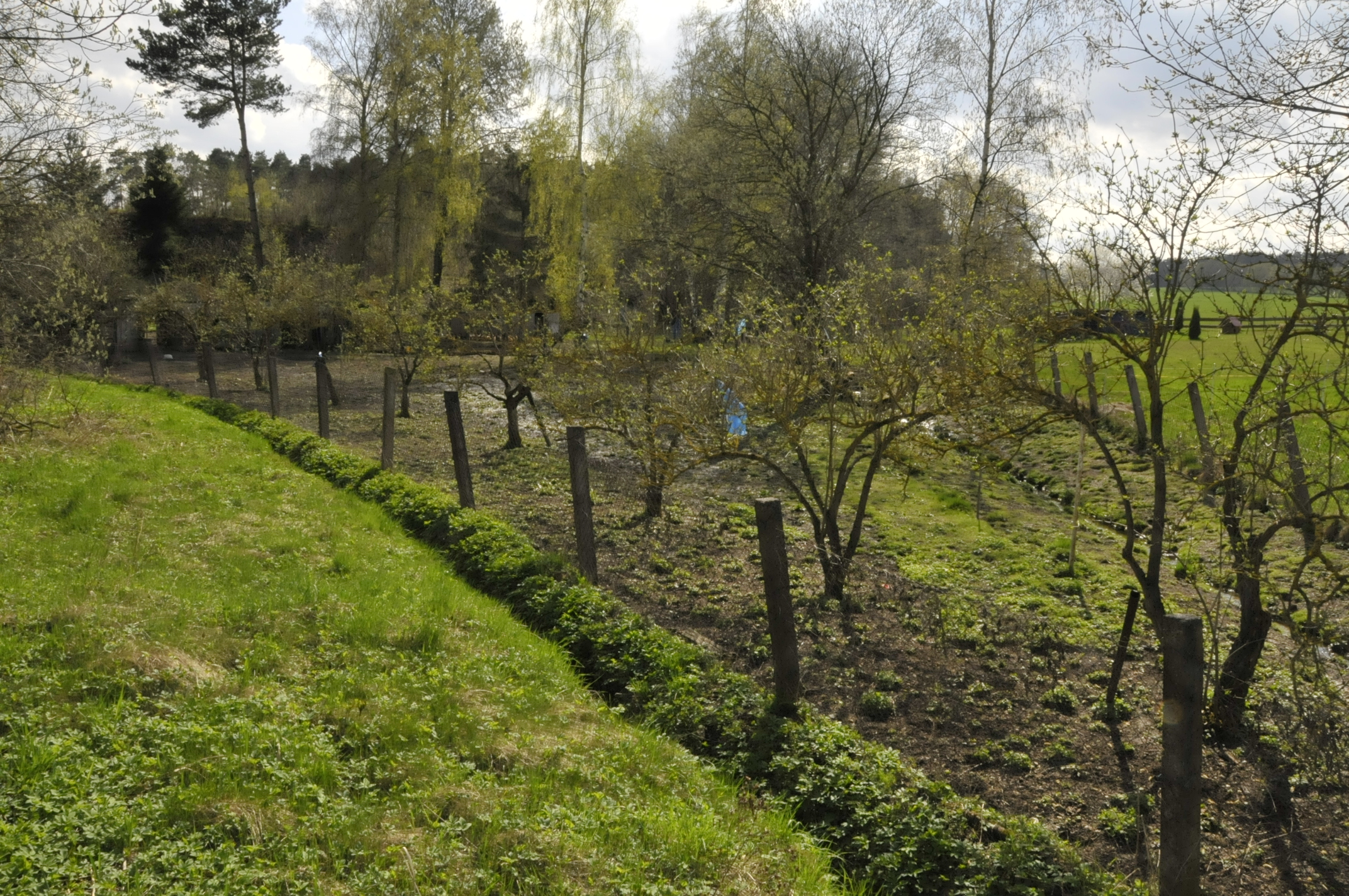

Location
- Country: Germany
- State: Thuringia

Physical characteristics
- Mouth
  - location: Ilm
  - coordinates: 50.6983°N 11.0189°E

Basin features
- Progression: Ilm→ Saale→ Elbe→ North Sea

Wümbach is a small river of Thuringia, Germany. It joins the Ilm in Wolfsberg.

== See also ==
- List of rivers of Thuringia
