= Pilchowo, Szczecin =

Neighbourhood of Szczecin, Poland

Pilchowo
- Neighbourhood
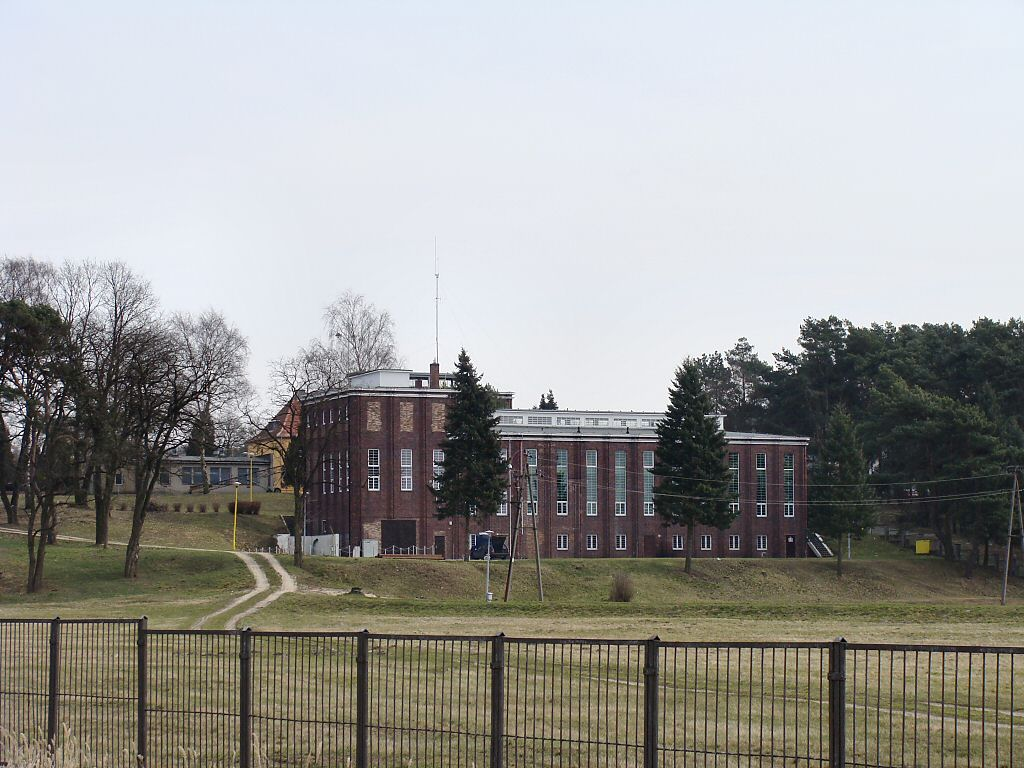
- The water supply building in Pilchowo.
- Interactive map of Pilchowo
- Coordinates: 53°29′35″N 14°28′47″E
- Country: Poland
- Voivodeship: West Pomeranian
- City and county: Szczecin
- District: West
- Administrative neighbourhood: Głębokie-Pilchowo
- Time zone: UTC+1 (CET)
  - Summer (DST): UTC+2 (CEST)
- Area code: +48 91
- Car plates: ZS

Pilchowo (Polish: [pilˈxɔ.vɔ]; German until 1945: Polchow [ˈpɔl.çoː]) is a small neighbourhood of Szczecin, Poland, located within the West district, in the administrative subdivision of Głębokie-Pilchowo. It is a residential area with single-family detached homes. It is placed at the city boundary, bordering the village of Pilchowo in Police County to the northwest. The village of Pilchowo was in the 13th century, as a small farming community. It was incorporated into the city in 1939. In 1945, the majority of the settlement was again separated as a village of Pilchowo, with only its southwest portion remaining under the city administration.

== Toponymy ==
The name Pilchowo comes from the Pomeranian-language nickname Polch or Płch, which comes from the Pomeranian word płch, meaning "rat". With addition of the suffix -owo, it came to mean "Polch's place". As the settlement remained under German administration for several centuries, its name was Germanised to Polchow. It was renamed to the Polish name Pilchowo after 1945.

== History ==
A piece of a scull of a male aurochs with an antler, dated at around 9,700 years, was discovered in a peatland near Pilchowo.

The village of Pilchowo (German: Polchow) was founded in the 13th century, as a small farming community. At the turn of the 14th century, the village became property of the Duke of Pomerania, and begun selling its farm products on large scale to the nearby city of Szczecin (Stettin). Around that time, a church building, made from granite bricks, was built in the village, now being known as the Church of the Assumption of the Blessed Virgin Mary. It was rebuilt and expanded in the second half of the 19th century, in a Romanesque Revival style. Originally belonging to the Roman Catholic denomination, it was changed to the Lutheranism in the 16th century during the Protestant Reformation. It was again changed to Roman Catholism in 1949.

On 15 October 1939, the area of Pilchowo was incorporated into the city of Szczecin. The city was captured by the Red Army of the Soviet Union on 26 April 1945, during the Second World War. It was placed under the Polish administration on 5 July 1945, while its suburbs, including Głębokie were placed under military Soviet occupation. The areas were returned under the Polish control on 4 October 1945, with the majority of Pilchowo remaining as a separate village. Its small southwest portion, located to the south of the Veletian Stream, and to the west of Zegadłowicza Street, was incorporated back into the city, also under the name of Pilchowo. The historic church building remained within the village.

From 1955 to 1976, Pilchowo was part of the neighbourhood of Głębokie, which one of the administrative subdivisions of the Nad Odrą district. On 28 November 1990, the neighbourhood of Głębokie-Pilchowo was established as one of the administrative subdivisions of the West district, being governed by an elected neighbourhood council. It incorporated the neighbourhoods of Głębokie and Pilchowo.

== Characteristics ==
Pilchowo is a small residential area with single-family detached homes. It is placed at the city boundary, bordering the village of Pilchowo in Police County to the northwest. The boundary is marked by the Veletian Stream to the north, and Zegadłowicza Street to the east. The area is surrounded by the Ueckermünde Heath.
