= Głębokie, Szczecin =

Neighbourhood of Szczecin, Poland

Głębokie
- Neighbourhood
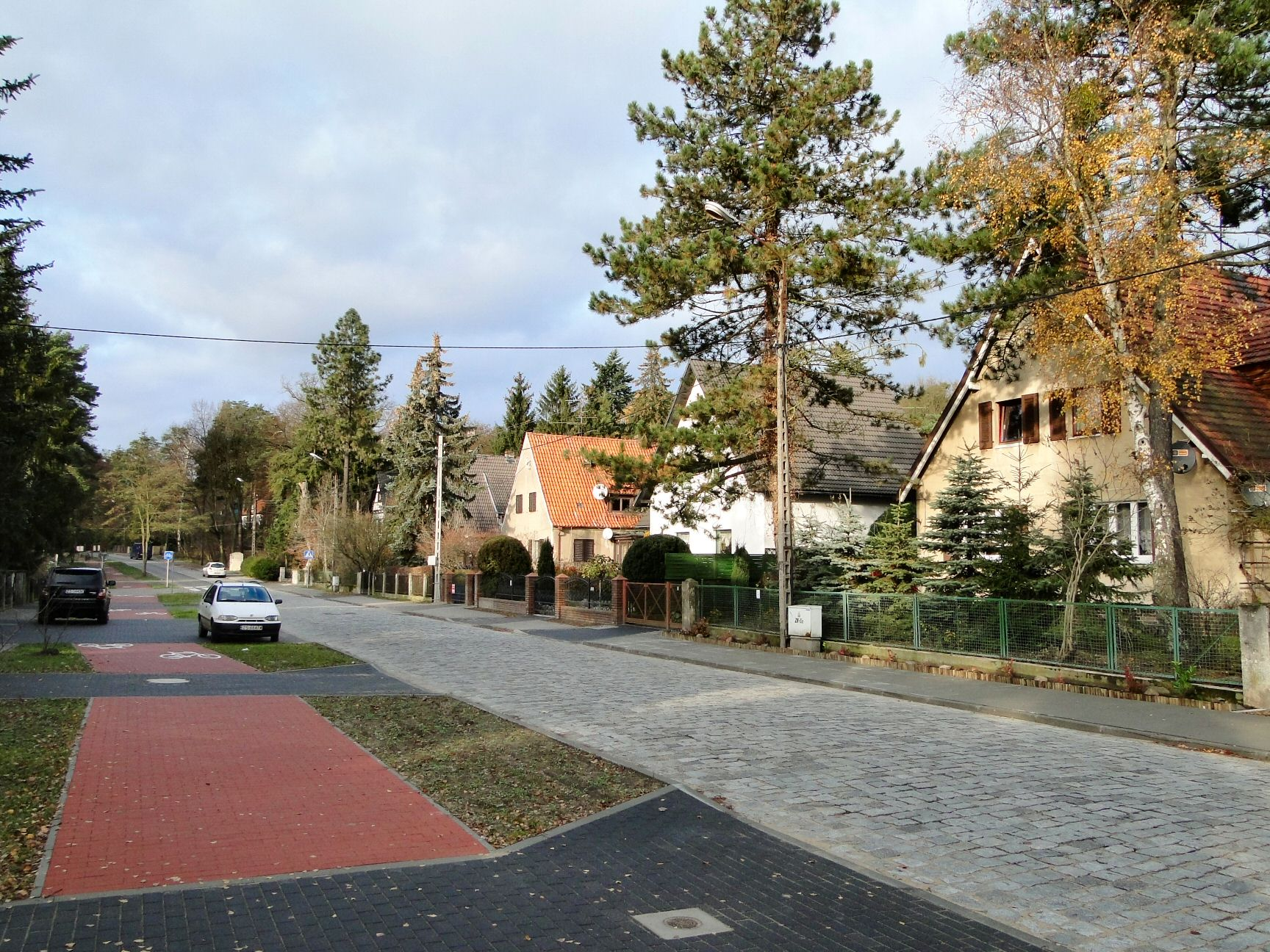
- The houses on Jaworowa Street in Głębokie.
- Interactive map of Głębokie
- Coordinates: 53°28′37″N 14°29′00″E
- Country: Poland
- Voivodeship: West Pomeranian
- City and county: Szczecin
- District: West
- Administrative neighbourhood: Głębokie-Pilchowo
- Time zone: UTC+1 (CET)
  - Summer (DST): UTC+2 (CEST)
- Area code: +48 91
- Car plates: ZS

Głębokie (Polish: [ɡwɛmˈbɔ.kjɛ]; German until 1945: Glambeck [ˈɡlam.bɛk]) is a small neighbourhood of Szczecin, Poland, located within the West district, in the administrative subdivision of Głębokie-Pilchowo. It is a residential area with single-family detached homes, many of which date to the 1930s and the 1960s. The neighbourhood is located on the east coast of the Głębokie Lake, which has an area of 31,4 ha, and features a bathing beach complex.

The oldest found signs of human activity in the area date to the Neolithic era, while the first known human settlements were founded there in the 4th century CE, during the Bronze Age. The oldest known records of Głębokie, then a small hamlet, date to 1266. The community operated seven gristmills alongside Osówka river, of which only one was preserved to the present day. In the 1930s, the area developed into a small suburb, and was incorporated into the city in 1939.

== Toponymy ==
The name of neighbourhood comes from the Polish word głębokie, which neuter nominative declination of adjective głęboki, meaning deep. It comes from the name of the nearby Głębokie Lake (Polish: Jezioro Głębokie; lit. 'Deep Lake'). Its Germanised version, Glambeck was used as the name of the neighbourhood until 1945.

== History ==
Pieces of ceramics and axes, dating to the Neolithic era, the Funnelbeaker culture, and the Comb Ceramic culture, were discovered within the area of the modern neighbourhood of Głębokie-Pilchowo. The first permanent human settlements were founded in the area in the 4th and 5th centuries CE, during the Bronze Age. Artifacts dating to between 10th and 11th to 12th centuries, were also discovered.

The oldest known records of Głębokie (German: Glambeck) date to 1266, when duke Barnim I granted the ownership of a half of the village to the St. Mary Church in Szczecin (Stettin). In 1342, the entire settlement became its property, with the village being exempted from taxation and duties. The village was placed on the coast of the Głębokie Lake.

In the Early Middle Ages, seven gristmills were built alongside the Osówka stream, located to the east of Głębokie and north of Osów (Wussow), and characterised by its strong current. The oldest mention of them come from 1277, when one of the mills was sold to the city by duke Barnim I. The rest of them were also bought by Szczecin in 1643. In 1418, to improve their output, dukes Otto II and Casimir IV issued permission to channel the water from Osówka into the Głębokie Lake. In the 19th century, the gristmills were refitted with steam engines, and later with diesel and electric engines. All but one of the Osów mills were demolished sometime after in 1945, leaving behind a series of small lakes, with the area being now known as the Seven Mills Valley.

In 1590, the village became the property of the Ramin family which was part of the aristocracy of Western Pomerania. In the 19th century, the Głębokie Lake and its surroundings became a popular recreational and hiking area, while Głębokie became a holiday village. In the 1920s, a bathing beach complex was opened at the Głębokie Lake.

In the 1930s, the owner of Głębokie, Barnim von Ramin, partitioned his land, with an area of 76 ha for the development on a villa suburb. In 1932, he entered into an agreement with the city of Szczecin, approving the creation of the suburb, with the city being designated to inherit the land after Ramin's death. The urban layout was designed by Berlin-based architect Heinrich Zeller. It was approved in 1931, and later updated by Zeller in 1935. The neighbourhood was developed on the coast of the Głębokie Lake, and to the east of Zagadłowicza Street, and consisted of single-family detached homes. It was developed in phases, with last two, the fourth and fifth phases, not being constructed due to the outbreak of the Second World War in 1939.

On 15 October 1939, the area of Głębokie was incorporated into the city of Szczecin. The city was captured by the Red Army of the Soviet Union on 26 April 1945 during the Second World War. It was placed under the Polish administration on 5 July 1945, while its suburbs, including Głębokie were placed under the Soviet military occupation. The neighbourhood was reincorporated into the city administration on 4 October 1945. Following the end of the conflict, the German population either fled or was expelled from Szczecin, and was replaced by Polish settlers.

In 1955, a tram tracks were built alongside Polish Armed Forces Avenue, connecting Głębokie with the rest of the city. It ended with a turning loop placed at the corner of Polish Armed Forces Avenue and Miodowa Street.

From 1955 to 1976, the neighbourhood of Głębokie formed one of the administrative subdivisions of the Nad Odrą district. It also included the neighbourhood of Pilchowo. In 1960, the area had the population of 1,456 people. On 28 November 1990, the neighbourhood of Głębokie-Pilchowo was established as one of the administrative subdivisions of the West district, being governed by an elected neighbourhood council. It incorporated the neighbourhoods of Głębokie and Pilchowo.

In the 1960s, several dozen new single-family housing developments were constructed in the neighbourhood. In the 1970s, an artificial lake, named the Fishing Pond, was dug out to the southeast of the neighbourhood, originally being crossed thought by the Osówka stream. Between 1989 and 1995, the St. Brother Albert Church, which belongs to the Roman Catholic denomination, was constructed at 20 Zegadłowicza Street in Głębokie.

== Characteristics ==
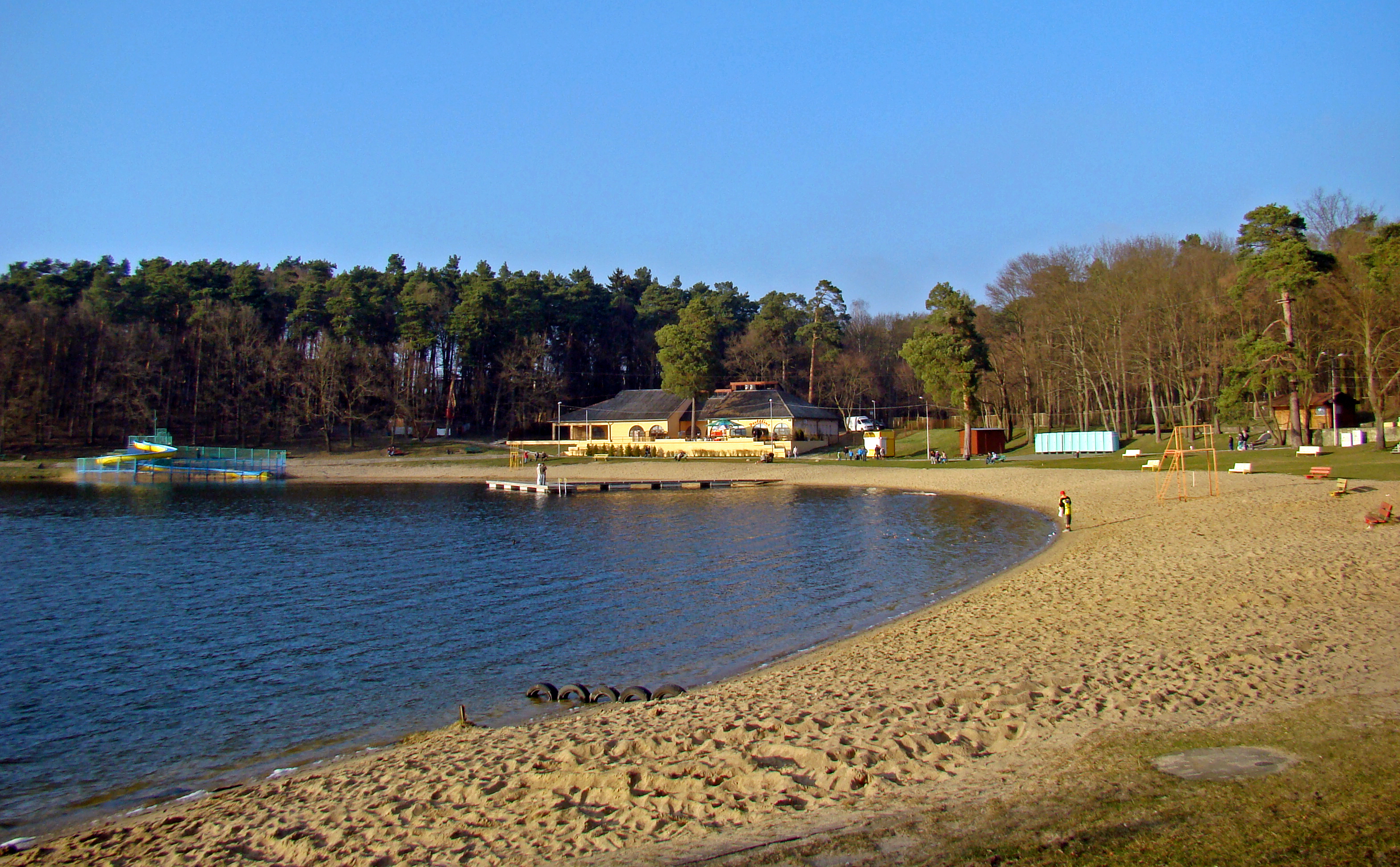
The beach at the Głębokie Lake.

Głębokie is a residential neighborhood with single-family detached homes, placed to the east of Zegadłowicza Street, in the area of Jaworowa, Majowa, and Pogodna Streets. Majority of its buildings date to the 1930s and the 1960s. It is located on the east coast of the Głębokie Lake, which has an area of 31,4 ha, and features a bathing beach complex. A small artificial lake, named the Fishing Pond, is also located to its southeast. The neighbourhood also features the St. Brother Albert Church, which belongs to the Roman Catholic denomination. The area is surrounded by a part of the Ueckermünde Heath, which forms the Głębokie Forest Park. The area alongside Osówka stream with seven small ponds, located to the east of the neighbourhood of Głębokie, is known as the Seven Mills Valley, after seven gristmills which were present alongside it between 13th and 20th centuries. One of the historic points is preserved to the present day.
