= Dill (river) =

River in Germany

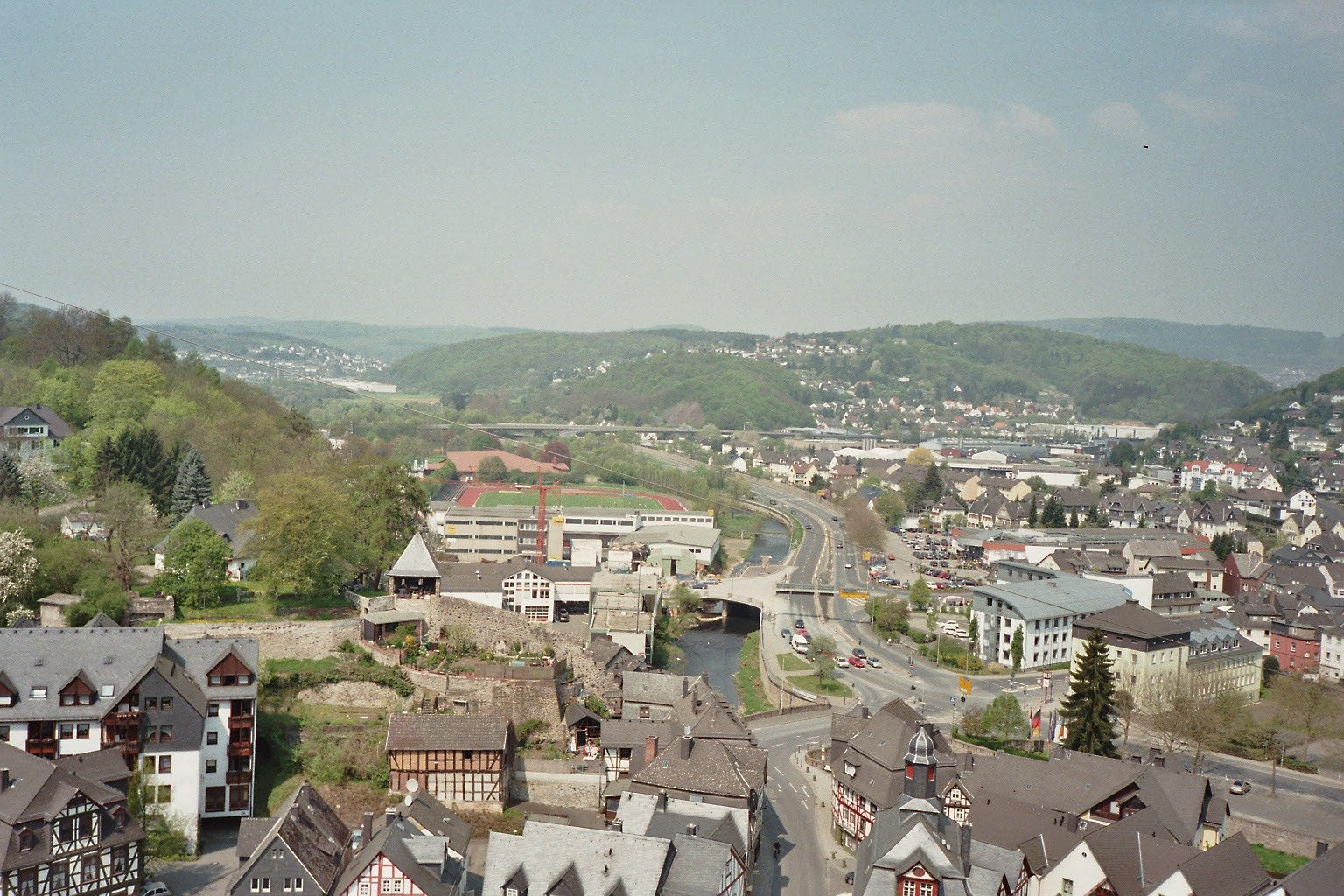
- View over Dillenburg from the Wilhelmsturm, with the river Dill clearly visible.

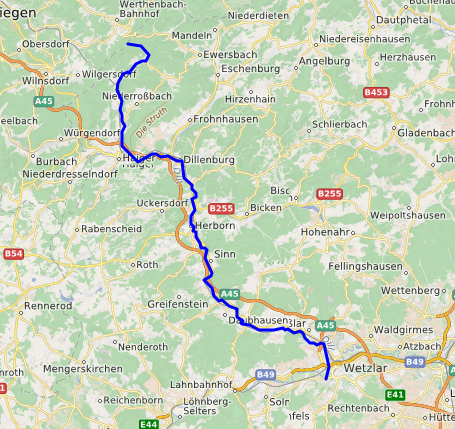

Location
- Country: Germany

Physical characteristics
- Source
  - location: Rothaargebirge / Westerwald
  - elevation: 567 m (1,860 ft)
- Mouth
  - location: Lahn
  - coordinates: 50°33′3″N 8°29′18″E
  - elevation: 147 m (482 ft)
- Length: 54.9 km (34.1 mi)
- Basin size: 717 km^{2} (277 sq mi)

Basin features
- Progression: Lahn→ Rhine→ North Sea

The Dill (German pronunciation: [dɪl]) is a 55 km (34 mi) long river, flowing through central Hesse in Germany. It is a tributary to the Lahn, joining it on the right bank at the town of Wetzlar.

== Course ==
The Dill flows exclusively through the Lahn-Dill-Kreis district in Hesse. The river originates at about 567 m above sea-level north of Haiger-Offdilln on the eastern slope of the Haincher Höhe (heights that reach 606 m), where the mountain ranges Rothaargebirge and Westerwald meet. During its course, roughly from north to south, the Dill passes the towns of Haiger, Dillenburg, Herborn, Aßlar, and finally empties into the Lahn at Wetzlar.

Many places on the banks of the river draw their names from it. On the river's upper reaches these are Offdilln, Dillbrecht, Fellerdilln, Dillenburg, and further downstream Dillheim. Dillenburg was the seat of the former Dillkreis district and residence town of the House of Orange-Nassau.

== Tributaries ==
Going downstream, the Dill's largest tributaries are: Roßbach, Haigerbach, Aubach, Donsbach, Dietzhölze, Nanzenbach, Schelde, Aar, Ambach, Rehbach, Lemp, and Blasbach.
