= Haiger =

- Town
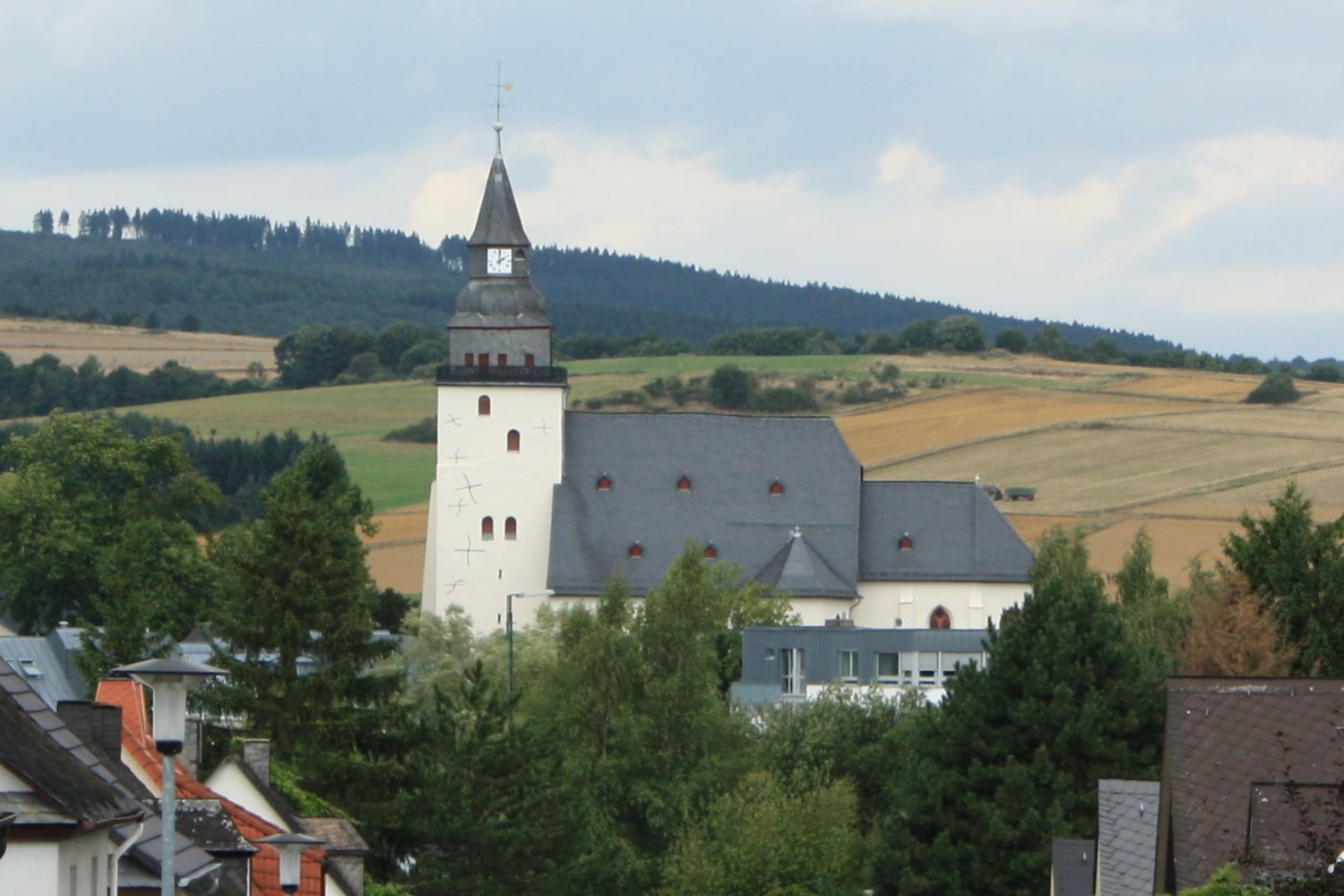
- Protestant Church

- Coat of arms

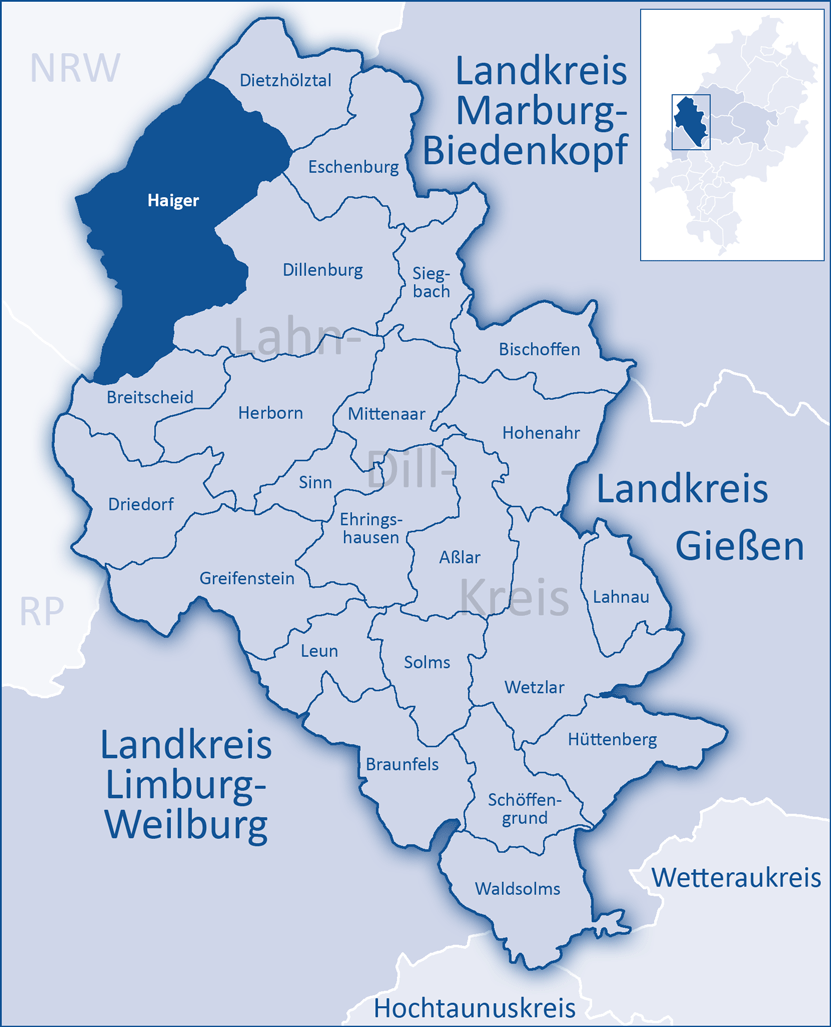
- Location of Haiger within Lahn-Dill-Kreis district
- Interactive map of Haiger
- Location within Germany Location within Hesse
- Coordinates: 50°44′32″N 08°12′14″E
- Country: Germany
- State: Hesse
- Admin. region: Gießen
- District: Lahn-Dill-Kreis

Government
  - Mayor (2020–26): Mario Schramm (Ind.)

Area
  - Total: 106.73 km^{2} (41.21 sq mi)
- Elevation: 272 m (892 ft)

Population (2025-12-31)
  - Total: 18,865
  - Density: 176.75/km^{2} (457.79/sq mi)
- Time zone: UTC+01:00 (CET)
  - Summer (DST): UTC+02:00 (CEST)
- Postal codes: 35708
- Dialling codes: 02771 / 02773 / 02774
- Vehicle registration: LDK, DIL
- Website: www.haiger.de

Haiger (German pronunciation: [ˈhaɪɡɐ]) is a country town in the Lahn-Dill-Kreis in Hesse, Germany. The nearest city is Siegen, about 25 km to the north.

== Geography ==
=== Location ===
Haiger lies about 5 km west of Dillenburg, and 20 km southeast of Siegen on the eastern edge of the Westerwald range, near where the three states of Hesse, North Rhine-Westphalia and Rhineland-Palatinate all share a common point. It is the district's northernmost town. The river Dill rises north of the constituent community of Offdilln.

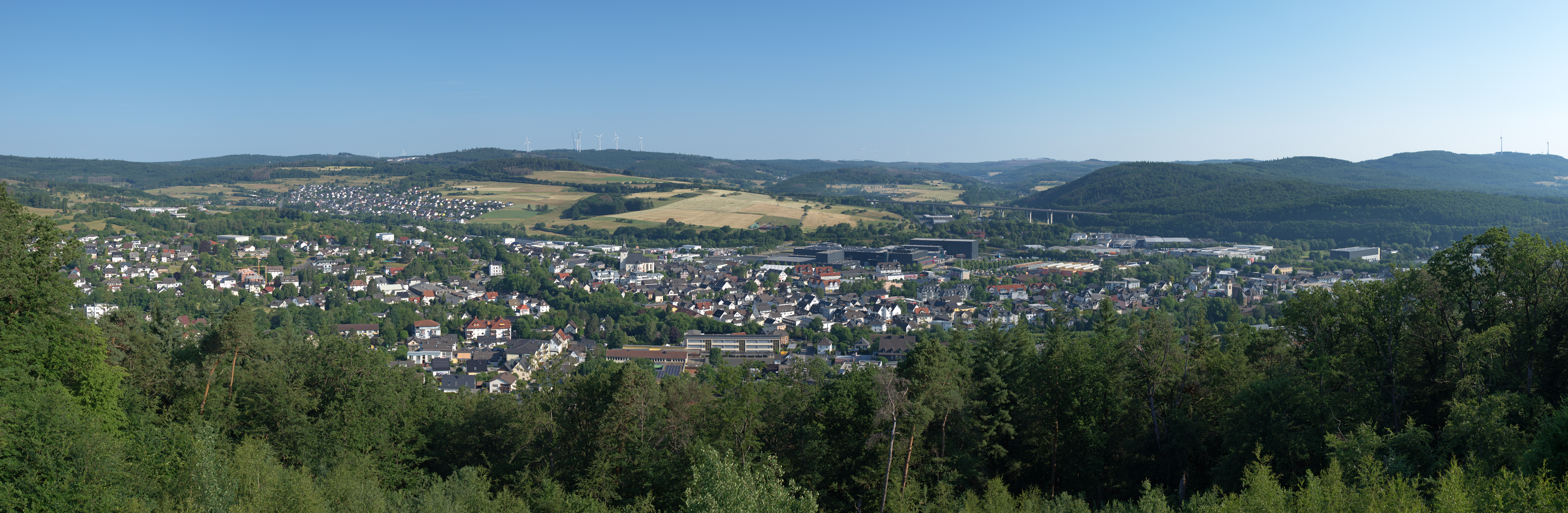
Panoramic view of Haiger from the Eduardstower

=== Neighbouring communities ===
Haiger borders to the north the town of Netphen (Siegen-Wittgenstein in North Rhine-Westphalia) and the community of Dietzhölztal, to the east with the community of Eschenburg and the town of Dillenburg, to the south with the community of Breitscheid (all in the Lahn-Dill-Kreis), and to the west with the communities of Burbach and Wilnsdorf (both in the Siegen-Wittgenstein district of North Rhine-Westphalia).

=== Constituent communities ===
Following a local government reform in the 1970s the rural villages of Sechshelden, Langenaubach, Flammersbach, Allendorf, Kalteiche, Haigerseelbach, Steinbach, Rodenbach, Fellerdilln, Dillbrecht, Offdilln, Weidelbach, Oberroßbach and Niederroßbach became part of the district of Haiger. These are culturally diverse and speak different versions of the local dialect.

== Population ==
(in each case on 31 December)

- 1998 - 20,298
- 1999 - 20,212
- 2000 - 20,222
- 2001 - 20,201
- 2002 - 20,169
- 2003 - 20,191
- 2004 - 19,959
- 2005 - 19,942

== History ==
Haiger is the earliest documented town on the river Dill. It was first mentioned in 778 in a gift deed of Lorsch monastery. The town is located at the meeting of three small valleys formed by the Haigerbach, Aubach and Dill, which in medieval times placed the town along important communication routes, but later more on the periphery. The town's most famous son was Johann Textor who was born here in 1582. Between 1608 and 1619 he was town clerk in Haiger and subsequently wrote the Nassauische Chronik, a comprehensive description of the area. One of the most famous historic depictions of the town is an engraving by Matthäus Merian. On 8 May 1729, the still fully walled town perished in a great fire that destroyed all buildings within a few hours. Even the town's church, built on an outcrop rising within the centre of town, was left in ruins. Quick financial help from surrounding principalities, towns and provinces, as well as a generous donation of 400 florins by Princess Isabella of Nassau-Dillenburg, helped relieve some of the worst deprivation.

=== Knights of Haiger ===
The nobles of Haiger were influential in the Haigermark. The Haigermark was also known as the Land of the Free Men (predium liberorum virorum), likely owing to the Knights' free rule (without intervening overlords between the family and the emperor). The family's influence gradually waned with the rise of the house of Nassau-Dillenburg.

== Name ==
The town's name, Haiger, is possibly derived from old middle German. The great number of herons (German: Fischreiher) on the Haigerbach, Aubach and Dill may have helped to give the town the name Reiherbach, or in old middle German Heigerahe. This name came from the words Heiger ( = Reiher) and Ahe ( = Bach; brook or waterway). Over the centuries, the spelling changed many times: → "Heigrahe" → "Heigera" → "Heigere" → "Heigerin" → "Heigre" → "Heigeren" → "Hegere" → "Hegera" → "Heygere" → "Heyger" → "Heiger" → "Häger" → "Häyer". Eventually, this became Haiger. The bird in the coat of arms may likewise be a reference to the herons, although it might also be a corruption of what was once the Lion of Nassau (see Coat of arms below).

== Politics ==
=== Coat of arms ===
Haiger's civic coat of arms was granted in 1908 and confirmed in 1934. The design goes back to a town seal used in the 15th century, although originally the town seal showed the Lion of Nassau (a golden lion) rising from a tower. The lion somehow changed into a jay, possibly as a misinterpretation. The jay nonetheless serves as a canting symbol (Häher is German for jay, and this resembles some older forms of the town's name). A structure has also grown up around the jay replete with spires, crosses, and apparently flying buttresses, too.

=== Town partnerships ===
- Montville, France

This partnership came into being through an initiative by the Johann-Textor-Schule in Haiger which has been conducting school exchanges with the Collège Eugène Noël in Montville for about 20 years. This friendship became official in Montville in 1991 and in Haiger in 1992 with the sealing of a document to this effect, signed by both towns' mayors. Citizens, clubs and groups maintain lively contacts.

- (France) Plombières-lès-Dijon (with Sechshelden)

In 1964, the villages of Plombières-lès-Dijon and Sechshelden – which was then an independent municipality – sealed this partnership whose origins are traceable to the thoughtfulness shown a former French prisoner of war taken in by some families in Sechshelden.

- (Germany) Wolfsberg, Thuringia

== Culture and sightseeing ==
=== Museums ===
- Heimatmuseum Haiger (local history)

As part of Haiger's 1200th anniversary celebrations of first documentary mention, this museum was established in 1978 in one of the loveliest half-timbered houses, built in 1724–1725, on the marketplace.

- Leinenmuseum Haigerseelbach (linen museum)
- Heimatstube Sechshelden

=== Buildings ===
- Stadtkirche Haiger: After the Kirchberg (Church Hill) in Haiger had been used, as must be assumed, for pagan purposes in pre-Christian times, a baptistery was built on the site once Christianity had arrived. In uncertain times the church's mighty tower served as defence and refuge. The church was gifted by King Konrad I on 14 April 914 together with the king's court - Meierhof - Heigera and the market rights, given to the Walpurgis Monastery.

In 1048, the new church building in the Romanesque style was consecrated by Archbishop Eberhard of Trier. More than 400 years later came further remodelling in the Late Gothic style: the flat wooden ceiling was replaced with a stone vault, and side naves and the choir were added.

Between 1485 and 1490 the choir was decorated by Flemish painters with three fresco bands. In the lower band they depict the story of Jesus's suffering from His entry into Jerusalem to His Ascension, in the middle band the Twelve Apostles, and in the upper band, under the vault, Jesus as the Judge of the Worlds, the Four Evangelists, the Veil of Veronica, and more.

The fresco paintings had been financed by the last two Knights of Haiger, Hermann and his son Jost.

After the Reformation was introduced in Nassau-Dillenburg in 1578, the frescoes were covered with whitewash probably around 1588. This proved to be a blessing since increasing layers of whitewash helped to preserve the fresco paintings well until their re-discovery. It is almost certain that the fire of 1729 would otherwise have destroyed the frescoes.

In about 1900, when the organ was resited to the centre gallery, it was noted that the whitewash had begun to flake off in various places. In 1902 parts of pictures came to light next to the vestry entrance, and in 1905 the paintings were fully uncovered once again.

World War II hit Haiger hard and bombings caused immense destruction. One bomb fell beside the church, but it did not go off, leaving the frescoes undamaged.

=== Regular events ===
- Altstadtfest (Old Town Festival)
- Lukasmarkt (market; October)
- Pfingstmarkt (Whitsun Market)
- Weihnachtsmarkt (Christmas Market; December)

=== Culinary specialities ===
Neujahrsscheiben ("New Year's Slices"), or Naujohrn in the local dialect, are baked traditionally in the constituent communities of Allendorf and Haigerseelbach between Christmas and New Year's Day. As a rule, these are round and made of rye meal, salt, pepper and water, thus being similar to Matzah, although other kinds of dough may be used. They are baked in a special iron over an open fire. There are also Fispeln, which unlike the usual Naujohrn are filled with pickled meat. Fispeln are baked in Steinbach.

== Economy and infrastructure ==
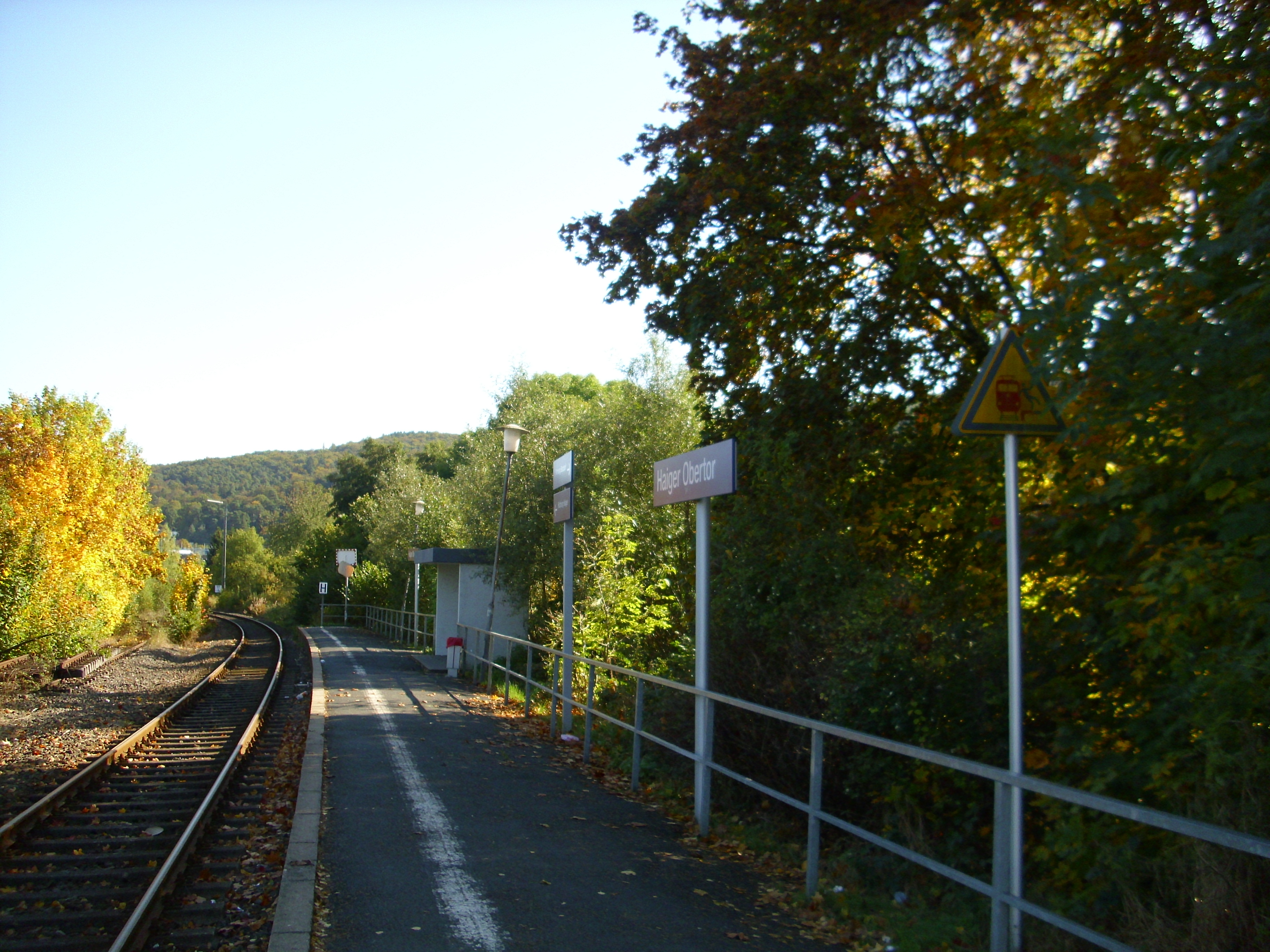
Haiger Obertor stop

Haiger has three stations along the Betzdorf–Haiger railway, which are Allendorf (Dillkr.), Haiger Obertor and Haiger, they are served by the local train line number RB96 of Hessische Landesbahn, section DreiLänderBahn, also the Dill railway from Siegen Hbf to Giessen connects the two to the railway network. Haiger is located in the transport association Rhein-Main-Verkehrsverbund (RMV), in the zone number 5847. Also local bus lines connect Haiger to the public transport.

=== Established businesses ===
- Carl Cloos Schweisstechnik GmbH
- Hailo – manufacturing ladders, steam ironing systems, etc.
- Klingspor Schleifsysteme GmbH & Co. KG
- Kuehne + Nagel (AG & Co.) KG (former Pracht Spedition und Logistik GmbH)
- Rittal GmbH & Co. KG, NL Haiger
- Loh Services GmbH & Co. KG (service and management company of Friedhelm Loh Group => Rittal)
- Schenker Deutschland AG, NL Haiger
- Weiss Chemie + Technik GmbH & Co.KG
- Ingersoll Cutting Tools

=== Media ===
==== Newspapers ====
- Haigerer Zeitung
- Haigerer Kurier

=== Public institutions ===
- fire brigade
- German Red Cross rescue station
- town library

=== Education ===
- Budenbergschule (specialised education school)
- Primary schools (Haiger, Sechshelden, Langenaubach, Allendorf, Dillbrecht, Roßbachtal)
- Kindergarten, 3 in Haiger and 12 more in outlying communities.
- Johann-Textor-Schule, comprehensive school with (Realschule and Gymnasium divisions up to level X, i.e. leading up to approximately the age of 16)

=== Sport ===
- Eintracht Haiger football club
- TV 1885 Haiger
- TSV Steinbach
