= Association of the Electrical and Digital Industry =

Engineering organization

- Formation: 1918
- Headquarters: Frankfurt am Main
- Leader: Günther Kegel, President Wolfgang Weber, CEO
- Website: www.zvei.org

ZVEI e. V., the German Electrical and Electronic Manufacturers' Association (formerly: German Electrical and Electronic Manufacturers' Association), represents the economic, technological and environmental interests of the German electrical and digital industry. With 910,400 employees across Germany and a total turnover of 242 billion euros (in 2023), the electrical industry is the second largest industrial sector in Germany (regarding in terms of employees) - behind mechanical engineering. With an additional 811,000 employees abroad, its value creation is highly globally networked (2021). In 2023, the industry spent 22.1 billion euros on research and development and nine billion euros on investments.

== Organisation ==
Its headquarters are in Frankfurt am Main. There are offices in Berlin and Brussels. The ZVEI is also represented by an office in Beijing through its EuropeElectro working group.

The association works with national trade associations and organisations, European industry and trade associations and international organisations. ZVEI is the second largest member of BDI, the Federation of German Industries. It is also a member of ORGALIM, the European umbrella organisation for the engineering industries. The ZVEI is also involved in the German TV Platform and the Industry 4.0 platform. The association is divided into 22 trade associations. The trade associations comprise all member companies that are active in the same market segment. A member may also belong to several trade associations due to its range of products and services. The ZVEI also maintains nine regional offices. They represent the interests of the electrical industry vis-à-vis the respective state governments.

== President and management ==
Gunther Kegel has been ZVEI President since October 2020 and BDI Vice President since November 2020. Kegel is chairman of the management board of Pepperl+Fuchs. Wolfgang Weber has been Chairman of the ZVEI Management Board since 2020.

== Industry initiative Licht.de ==
The Lighting Association in the ZVEI operates the industry initiative licht.de, which provides information about lighting and lighting technology as well as guidelines and standards that must be observed for professional lighting solutions. Among other things, the industry initiative accompanied the technological change from incandescent lamps to energy-efficient light sources in the course of the Ecodesign Directive with campaigns. Licht.de informs consumers, professional users, planners and architects through traditional media work and online offerings. One focus is on educating people about future technologies such as Human Centric Lighting (HCL). The industry initiative operates an information portal on the Internet and publishes the "licht.wissen" series of publications. It currently comprises 21 titles. As a rule, each issue is dedicated to a specific lighting application: for example, in schools, hospitals or offices, but also in museums or streets. Cross-cutting topics such as LEDs and the effect of light on people are also covered. The licht.forum series and other licht.de publications such as guidelines are published on current topics. The association founded the Fördergemeinschaft Gutes Licht (FGL) in 1970, which was renamed licht.de in 2007.

The website is officially home to the LED lead market initiative. It was founded by the Federal Ministry of Education and Research and has been continued by the Federal Ministry for the Environment since the beginning of 2012 with the aim of supporting the broad market launch of LEDs in Germany and reducing CO_{2} emissions.

== Publications ==
- ZVEI-Spotlights (Digital annual review)
- ZVEI-Magazind Ampere
- Publications of ZVEI
