= Aar (Dill) =

River in Germany

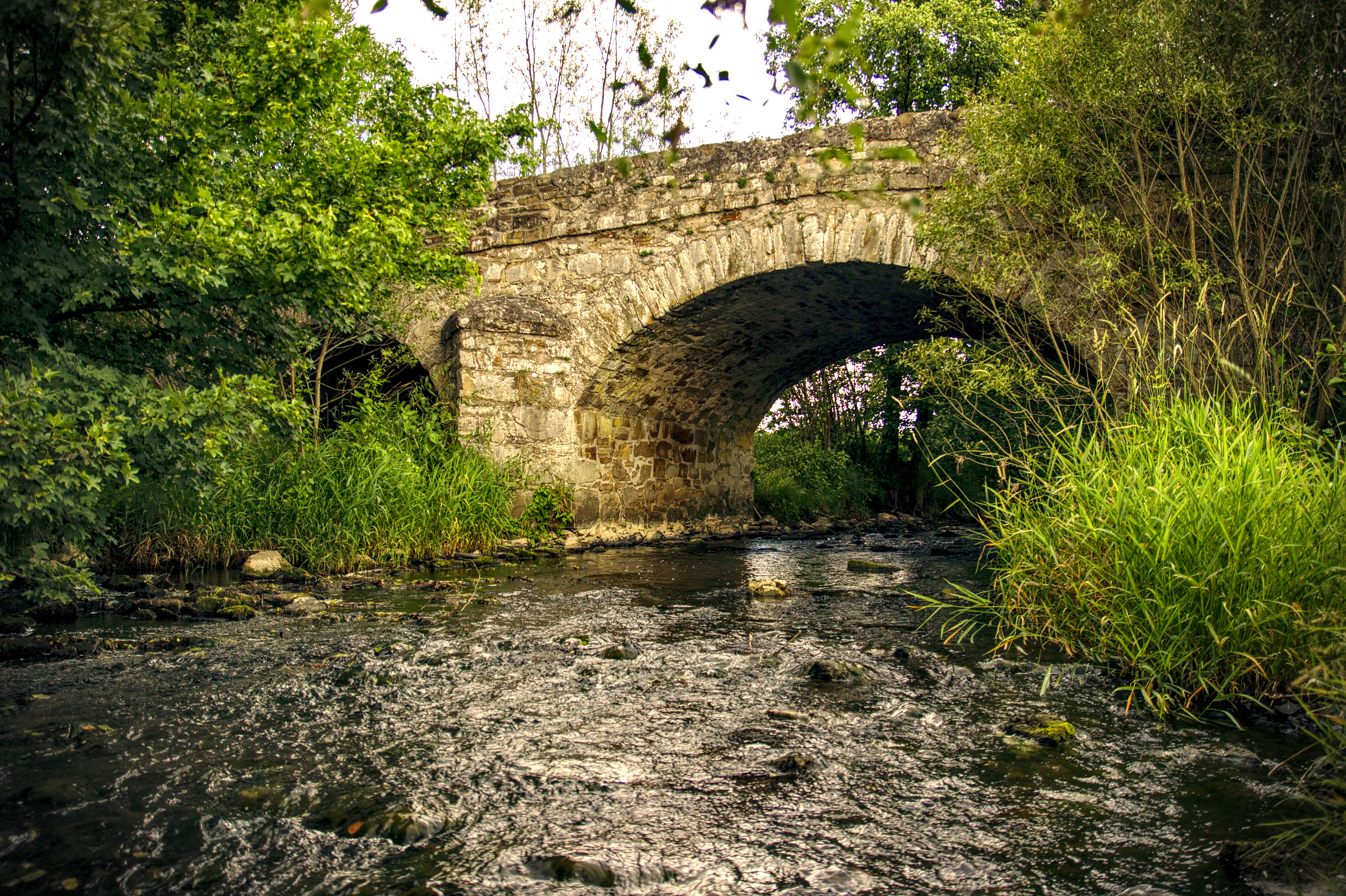

- Mouth

Location
- Country: Germany
- State: Hesse

Physical characteristics
- Mouth
  - location: Dill
  - coordinates: 50.6977°N 8.3079°E
- Length: 20.6 km (12.8 mi)

Basin features
- Progression: Dill→ Lahn→ Rhine→ North Sea

The Aar is a river of Hesse, Germany. It flows for 20.6 kilometres (12.8 mi) into the Dill from the left bank near Herborn.

== Tributaries ==
The tributaries of the Aar are as follows:

- Brühlsbach (right) - 3.3 km
- Stadterbach (left) - 6.6 km
- Wilsbach (right) - 6.3 km
- Weidbach (right) - 5.9 km
- Meerbach (right) - 5.2 km
- Siegbach (right) - 12.2 km
- Gellenbach (left) - 4.2 km
- Weibach (right) - 6.3 km
- Gettenbach (left) - 3.6 km
- Ballersbach (left) - 3.2 km
- Essenbach (right) - 3.3 km
- Dernbach (left) - 2.7 km
- Monzenbach (right) - 4.5 km

== See also ==
- List of rivers of Hesse
