= Veletian Stream =

Wielecki Potok
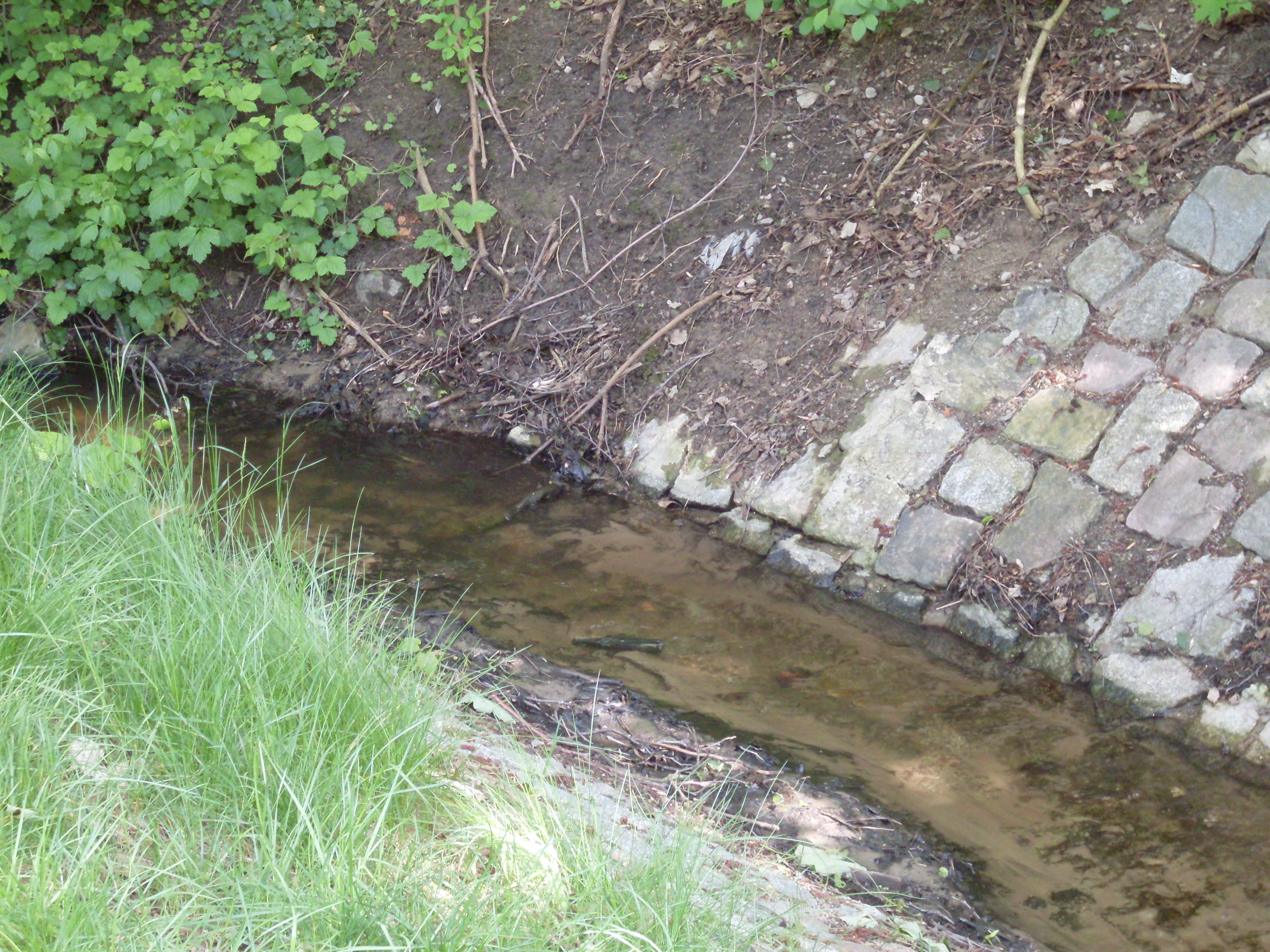

Location
- Country: Poland

Physical characteristics
- Source
  - location: Devil's Swamp
- Mouth
  - location: Bagno Pilchowskie (Swamp of Pilchowo)
- Length: 7 km (4.3 mi)

Wielecki Potok (German: Der schwarze Bach), also known as Wałęcki Potok, is a stream in Poland. The stream is around 7 km long. The stream begins in the Devil's Swamp in the Warsaw Hills at the base of the Veletian Mountain, near the abandoned village Goślice. The stream flows into Pilchowskie Swamp, through Ueckermünde Heath, and by the Polish village Pilchowo. Near Pilchowo, the stream marks the boundary between Pilchowo's urban and rural administrative divisions.
