= Bathing lake =

Natural or artificial lake used for public bathing and swimming

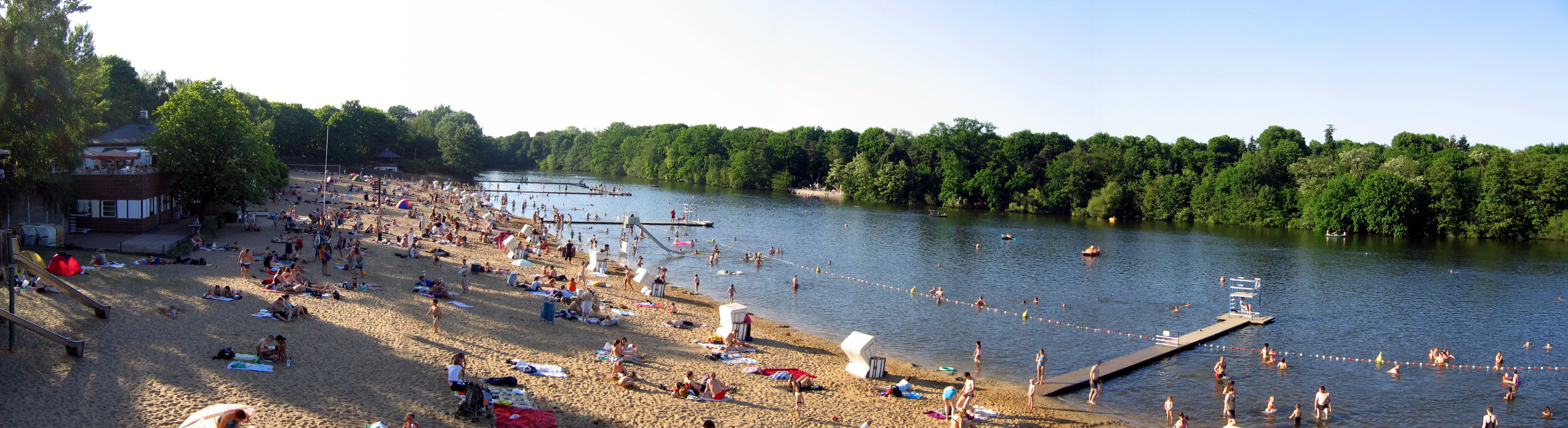
A public bathing area at the Plötzensee in Berlin

A bathing lake is a natural or artificial lake that is used for public bathing and swimming. In the water, bathers mostly remain close to the shore and use the area for recreational purposes, such as sport, games and sunbathing. In Europe, because of climate conditions, bathing lakes are mostly used in the summer.

== Use ==
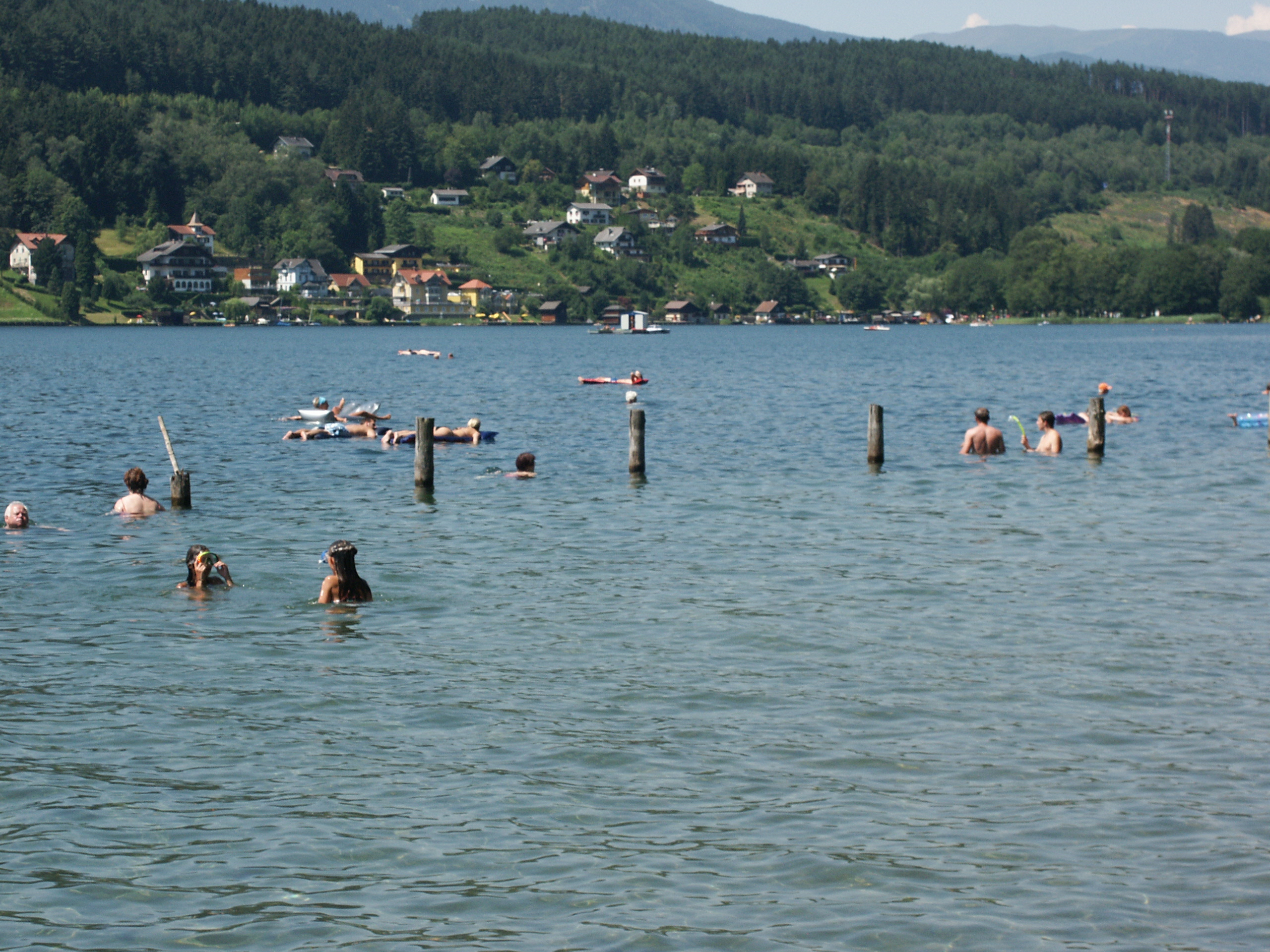
The Millstätter See in Carinthia

In the interest of bathers and swimmers, many bathing lakes prohibit ships and boats, fishing, dogs etc. Because of conservation reasons, open fires and use of soap or shampoo is also usually prohibited. Contrary to non-European countries (such as India), bathing in the lakes is nowadays not done primarily to cleanse the body, but rather for entertainment and social reasons.

Most bathing lakes are free of charge to use. Larger bathing lakes have institutions to protect the security of the bathers, such as DLRG or Wasserwacht in Germany. Contrary to bathing areas with an entrance fee, most bathing lakes have neither changing rooms or toilets. However, better-equipped bathing lakes have culinary services with toilets. Bathing lakes are also used for night swimming and naked swimming.

== Purpose ==
A bathing lake provides inhabitants with a possibility to relax and participate in sports in their own neighborhood. A bathing lake can significantly increase the attractiveness of a neighborhood.

Sometimes parts of the shore of a bathing lake are separated into land lots and sold to private persons.

== Installation of artificial lakes as bathing lakes ==
Artificial lakes made by holding groundwater on a pebble or loam surface, and sometimes having water input from springs, are often used as bathing lakes. Usually a land restoration is done after construction of the lake bottom, providing a comfortable environment for bathers. In principle, every lake can be used as a bathing lake. Thus reservoirs can also be used as bathing lakes. However, artificial lakes have added value to the inhabitants.

In a big enough private garden a bathing lake can be formed with a natural pool.

== Naked bathing ==
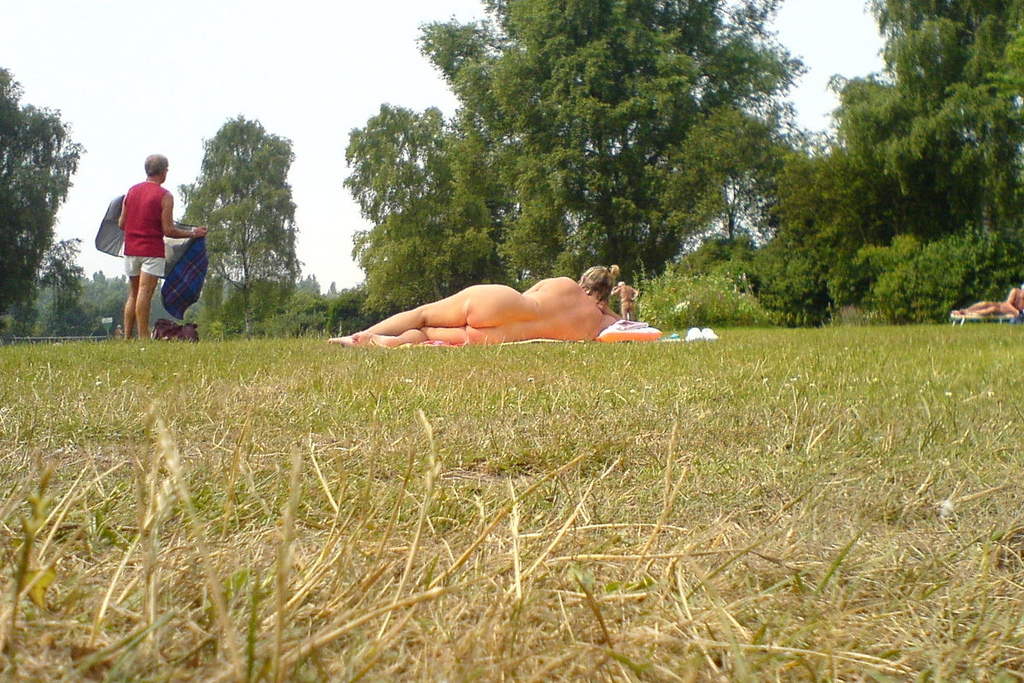
Nudist-Area at Unterbacher See, Düsseldorf, Germany

At some bathing lakes, particularly in Germany, naturism, in other words full nudity, is allowed. Often specific areas of the lake shore are designated for naturism. Women are allowed to expose their breasts for bathing or sunbathing at most public bathing lakes in Europe. Otherwise a bathing suit is required.
