= Wolfsberg, Thuringia =

Wolfsberg
- Stadtteil of Ilmenau
- Coat of arms
- Interactive map of Wolfsberg
- Location within Germany Location within Thuringia
- Coordinates: 50°42′20″N 10°59′20″E
- Country: Germany
- State: Thuringia
- District: Ilm-Kreis
- Town: Ilmenau

Area
  - Total: 28.63 km^{2} (11.05 sq mi)
- Elevation: 400 m (1,300 ft)

Population (2016-12-31)
  - Total: 2,918
  - Density: 101.9/km^{2} (264.0/sq mi)
- Time zone: UTC+01:00 (CET)
  - Summer (DST): UTC+02:00 (CEST)
- Postal codes: 98704
- Dialling codes: 036785
- Vehicle registration: IK
- Website: www.wolfsberggemeinde.de

Wolfsberg (German pronunciation: [ˈvɔlfsˌbɛʁk]) is a village and a former municipality in the district Ilm-Kreis, in Thuringia, Germany.

Wolfsberg was created in 1994 by uniting the former municipalities Bücheloh, Gräfinau-Angstedt and Wümbach. Since July 2018, Wolfsberg is part of the town Ilmenau.
