= Krzekowo =

Neighbourhood of Szczecin, Poland

- Neighbourhood
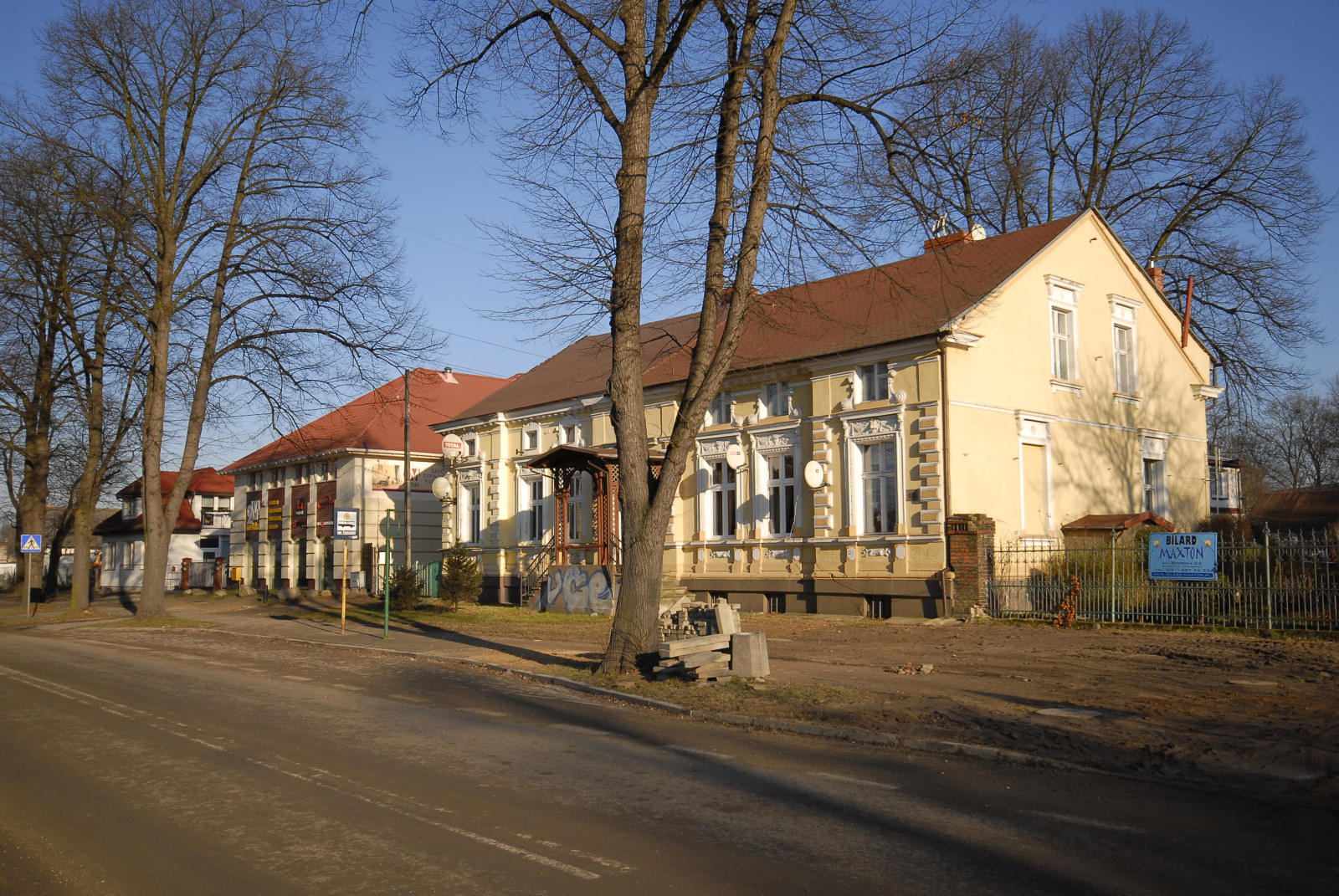
- The houses on Szeroka Street in Krzekowo.
- Interactive map of Krzekowo
- Coordinates: 53°26′50″N 14°28′44″E
- Country: Poland
- Voivodeship: West Pomeranian
- City and county: Szczecin
- District: West
- Administrative neighbourhood: Krzekowo-Bezrzecze
- Time zone: UTC+1 (CET)
  - Summer (DST): UTC+2 (CEST)
- Area code: +48 91
- Car plates: ZS

Krzekowo (Polish: [kʂɛˈkɔ.vɔ]; German until 1945: Kreckow [ˈkʁɛ.koː]) is a small neighbourhood of Szczecin, Poland, located within the West district, in the administrative subdivision of Krzekowo-Bezrzecze. It is a residential area with single-family detached homes and terraced houses. It includes the Holy Trinity Church, a Roman Catholic parish church dating to the 13th century, from before 1261. The neighbourhood is crossed by the Bukowa strea. Four human settlements were present in the area of modern Krzekowo during the Neolithic era. Later, it also included settlements of the Lusatian culture, and later the Hallstatt culture during the Bronze Age, and from the 6th and 7th centuries, and from the 13th century during the Early Middle Ages. The hamlet of Krzekowo was founded in the 13th century, with its oldest known records dating to 1240. It was incorporated into the city of Szczecin in 1939.

== Toponymy ==
The name Krzekowo comes from the Old Polish words krzekać and krzekotać, related to the modern Polish word skrzeczeć, meaning "to squawk" and "to screech", referring to the sounds made by frogs which were numerous in the area. The German name Kreckow, used until 1945, was a Germanised form of the Slavic name.

== History ==
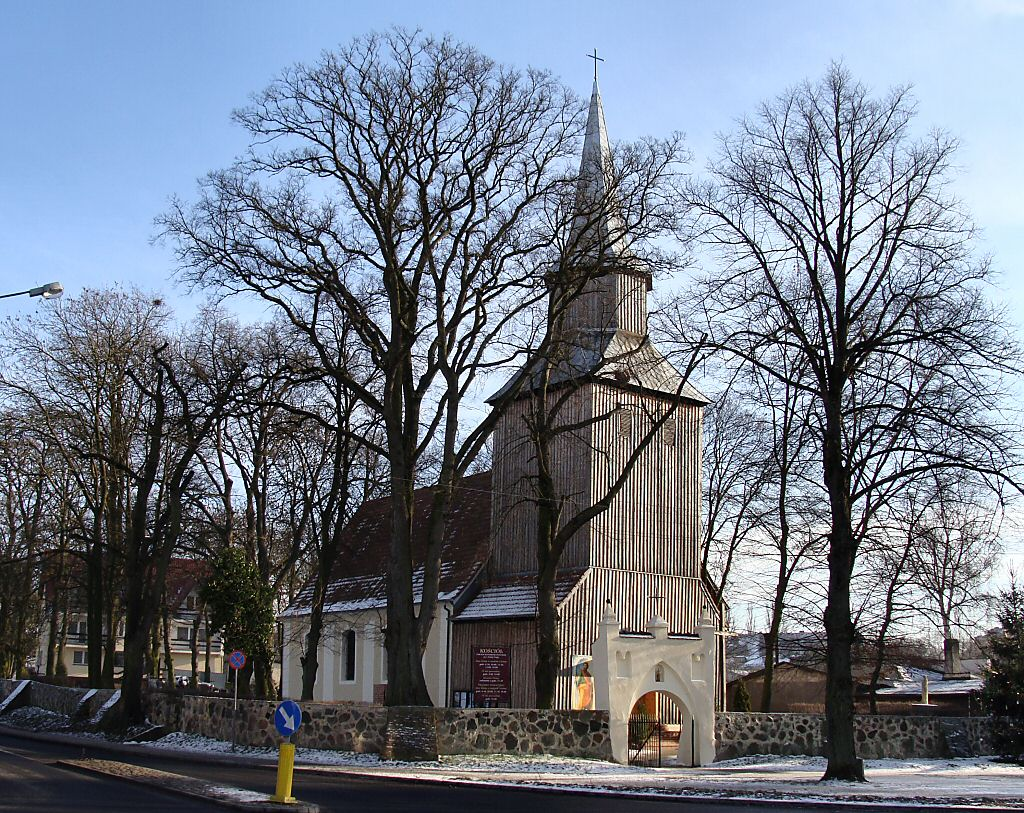
The Holy Trinity Church in Krzekowo, built in the 13th century, before 1261.

In the Neolithic period, the modern area of Krzekowo included four human settlements present alongside the Bukowa stream. Several tools dating to that period were discovered, including four axes, chisel, and an arrowhead. A flint tool was from the Paleolithic period was also found. The area also included settlements of the Lusatian culture, and later the Hallstatt culture, during the Bronze Age. A cemetery of the Lusatian culture was also discovered. In the Early Middle Ages, the human settlements from the 6th and 7th centuries, and from the 13th century were also present, with 133 pieces of ceramics and arrowheads being discovered. The archeological findings in Krzekowo came from the areas around Sosabowskiego and Łukasińskiego Streets.

The hamlet of Krzekowo (German: Kreckow) was founded in the 13th century, with its oldest records dating to 1240. At the time it paid a tithe tax to duke Barnim I, the ruler of the Duchy of Pomerania-Stettin, from 30 voloks of land (approximately 537 ha), which it held as a fiefdom from Konrad III, the bishop of Cammin. In 1277, duke Barnim I granted the ownership of Krzekowo together with its 60 voloks of land (approximately 1,074 ha) to the city of Szczecin (Stettin). The hamlet begun paying the taxes to the city, while its residents received the rights and privileges of its citizens. The ownership of the hamlet was reconfirmed by duke Bogislaw IV in 1293, Otto I in 1308, and duke Wartislaw IV in 1308.

In the 13th century, a stone Roman Catholic church, now known as the Holy Trinity Church, was built in Krzekowo, with the oldest known records dating to 1261. In 1286, Hermann von Gleichen, the bishop of Cammin, granted the administration over it to the St. Mary Church in Szczecin. In the 16th century, its denomination was changed to the Lutheranism during the Protestant Reformation. The building was expanded in 1729, including the construction of a steeple tower made from wood and bricks. In 1949, it again became a Roman Catholic parish church.

In the 17th century, the population of Krzekowo included ten landowners and two smallholders. The hamlet had 63 voloks of land (approximately 1127.7 ha), of which 34 belonged to the farmers, 19 to the land administrator, 2 to the Holy Spirit Church in Krzekowo, and 2 to the St. Catherine Church in Świerczewo (Schwarzow). The hamlet also owned the nearby forest near Bezrzecze (Brunn), and leased a pasture to its residents in the 18th century. The land administrator paid 500 thalers of an annual tithe tax to the city of Szczecin, while every farmer paid 246 bushels (15,763.68 litres) of Secale grain and 222 bushels (14,225.76 litres) of Avena grain. Every farmer and smallholder was obliged to work for three days for the land administrator. The owner of Krzekowo also held the exclusive right to fish in the nearby Głębokie Lake. Due to the large presence of fish such as northern pike, European perch, and Common rudds, the city of Szczecin, as well as residents of Krzekowo contested the exclusivity in the court against the Ramin family.

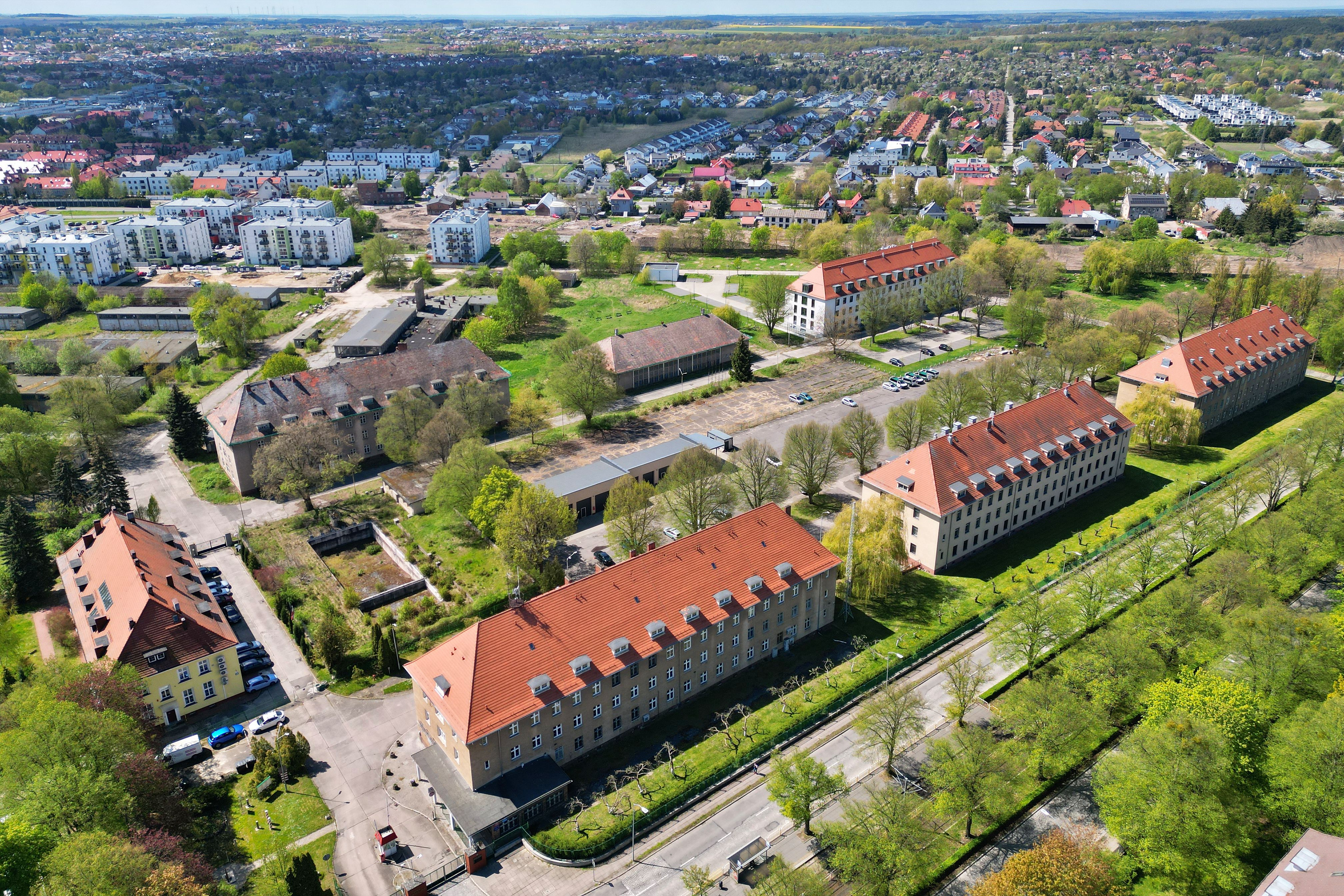
The former military barracks complex at Żołnierska Street, founded in the 19th century to the east of Krzekowo.

In the 19th century, a complex of barracks of the Prussian Army was developed in the area between the current Żołnierska, Klonowica, and Wernyhory Streets, to the east of Krzekowo. A large military training area, named the Krzekowo Filed (German: Kreckower Feld), was created to the north of the barracks. In 1862, it included ten residential buildings, as well as other military structures. It was expanded in the following decades. In 1897, it had five residential barracks, as well as gastronomical buildings, bathhouses, horse stables, administrative buildings, and warehouses. In 1910, the entire complex had an area of 362.94 ha. In the following years, it was expanded with buildings on Klonowica Street. The military also owned nearby shooting ranges at the intersection of the current Polish Armed Forces Avenue and Szeroka Street. In 1870, during the Franco–Prussian War, a prisoner-of-war camp was built at the military training area, for the captured French soldiers. Over six houndred of them died in the camp, of which, 248 were buried on a cemetery dedicated to them, built nearby on the current Litewska Street. The complex of barracks was visited by Wilhelm I, the Emperor of Germany, on 13 October 1897. Around 1930, a new complex was developed to the south, at the corner of the current Łukasińskiego and Sosabowskiego Streets for the infantry soldiers. Between 1935 and 1936, new barracks were constructed in the complex, between the current Klonowica, Janickiego, Mickiewicza, and Żołnierska Streets.

In 1909, a military airfield was opened at the military training area, becoming the first airfield of Szczecin. The same year, the Wright brothers, presented their aircraft Wright Flyer III at the airfield, in an air show open to the public. They were two aviation pioneers generally credited with inventing, building, and flying the world's first successful airplane in 1903. On 18 June 1910, the first aviation accident with a civilian fatality in the history of Germany, as well as the first in Szczecin, took place at the airfield. Thaddäus Robl, a cyclist and pilot, died after the Farman III pusher biplane, which he piloted, crashed onto the runway during landing. The airfield hosted airshows annually. It was used by the German Air Combat Forces during the First World War, and closed in 1918. It was reopened in 1920 as a civilian aerodrome, with flights to Berlin, Copenhagen, Gdańsk, Klaipėda, Stockholm, and Riga. A branch of Berlin-based flight school was opened there in 1923, and a weather station was opened in 1924. The aerodrome was closed down in 1931, due to presence of the Szczecin Dąbie Airfield founded in 1927. In the 1970s, the housing estate of Zawadzkiego-Klonowica, consisting of apartment buildings, was developed in place of the former military training area and the airfield. Since 1990, it forms a separate administrative neighbourhood.

After the end of the Second World II in 1945, the northern barracks complex on Żołnierska Street begun briefly housing soldiers of the Red Army of the Soviet Union, and later the soldiers of the Polish Land Forces, which used it until 2002. In 1995, the building at 47 Żołnierska Street begun housing the Faculty of Economics of the Szczecin University of Technology, which was replaced by the West Pomeranian University of Technology in 2009. The campus was expanded in the following decades, currently housing faculties and buildings of the Maritime University of Szczecin, the Pomeranian Medical University, and the West Pomeranian University of Technology. It also houses the West Pomeranian Business School, a private university founded in 1989, located at 53 Żołnierska Street. The southern complex on Łukasińskiego Street continues to be used by the military, since 1999, housing the headquarters of the Multinational Corps Northeast of NATO. Since 1990, the area belongs administratively to the neighbourhood of Pogodno.

In 1820, following a legal dispute ending with the abolition of serfdom in Krzekowo, the city of Szczecin was ordered to grant them 1,726 morgen (440.7 ha) of land. On 15 October 1939, Krzekowo was incorporated into the city of Szczecin. On 26 April 1945, during the Second World War, it was captured by the 2nd Shock Army of the 2nd Belorussian Front, a part of the Red Army of the Soviet Union. The city was placed under the Polish administration on 5 July 1945, while its suburbs, including Krzekowo, were placed under the Soviet military occupation. The area was returned under the Polish control on 4 October 1945, being incorporated back into the city. The German population either left or was forced out from the city, and was replaced by Polish settlers.

In 1948, the tram line tracks were built in the east of Krzekowo, alongside Żołnierska Street, with a turning loop built in 1954 near the intersection with Klonowica Street. In 2024, the loop was demolished, and the line was extended to the north alongside Sosabowskiego and Szafera Streets.

From 1955 to 1976, the neighbourhood of Krzekowo formed one of the administrative subdivisions of the Nad Odrą district. In 1960, the area had a population of 1,231 people. On 28 November 1990, the neighbourhood of Krzekowo-Bezrzecze was established as one of the administrative subdivisions of the West district, being governed by an elected council. It incorporated the neighbourhoods of Krzekowo and Bezrzecze.

In the 1960s, a series of greenhouses were developed in the neighbourhood, alongside Szeroka Street. In 1970, Krzekowo had a population of 650 people.

In 2019, a bronze statue dedicated to Wojtek (1942–1963), a Syrian brown bear which accompanied the 2nd Polish Corps during the Second World War, was unveiled in Krzekowo. It was placed at the Wojtek the Bear Square, at the corner of Misia Wojtka and Żyzna Streets. The sculpture was designed by Bogdan Ronin-Walknowski.

== Characteristics ==
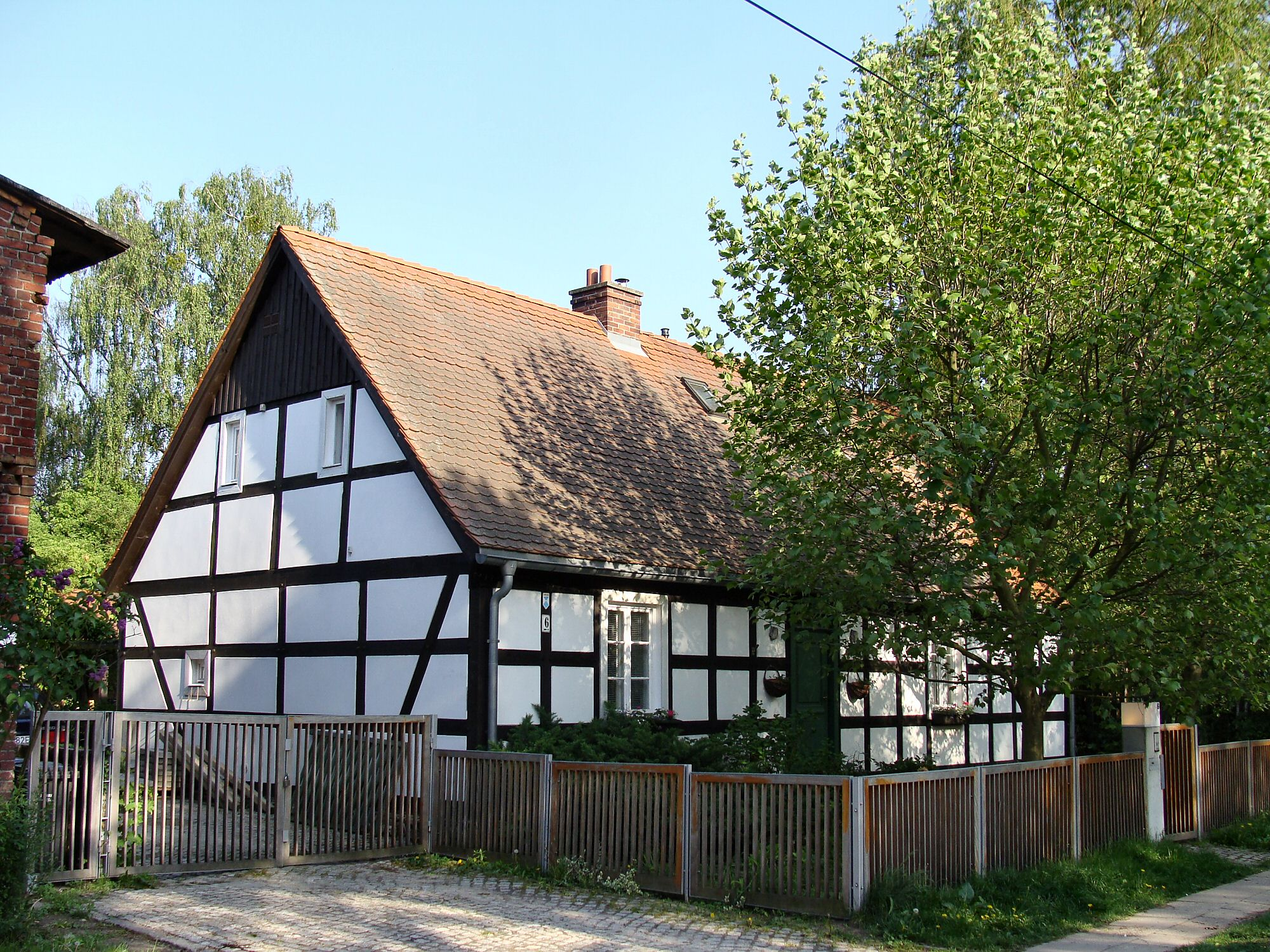
The timber-framed house at 6 Szeroka Street in Krzekowo, dating to 1895.

Krzekowo is a residential area with single-family detached homes and terraced houses. It features the Holy Trinity Church, a Roman Catholic parish church dating to the 13th century, from before 1261, which is located at 1A Żołnierska Street. The neighbourhood also includes a timber-framed house, located at 6 Szeroka Street, which, dating to 1895, is one of the oldest buildings in the area, and a 5-storey brick mill and residential building at 19 and 19A Szeroka Street, dating to 1928. Additionally, Krzekowo also features a bronze statue dedicated to Wojtek (1942–1963), a Syrian brown bear which accompanied the 2nd Polish Corps during the Second World War. It is placed at the Wojtek the Bear Square, at the corner of Misia Wojtka and Żyzna Streets. The sculpture was designed by Bogdan Ronin-Walknowski, and unveiled in 2019. In the east, the neighbourhood is crossed though by the tram line tracks alongside Żołnierska and Sosabowskiego Streets. Krzekowo is also passed through by the Bukowa stream, which flows to the south towards the Oder river.
