= Krzekowo-Bezrzecze =

Neighbourhood of Szczecin, Poland

- Administrative neighbourhood
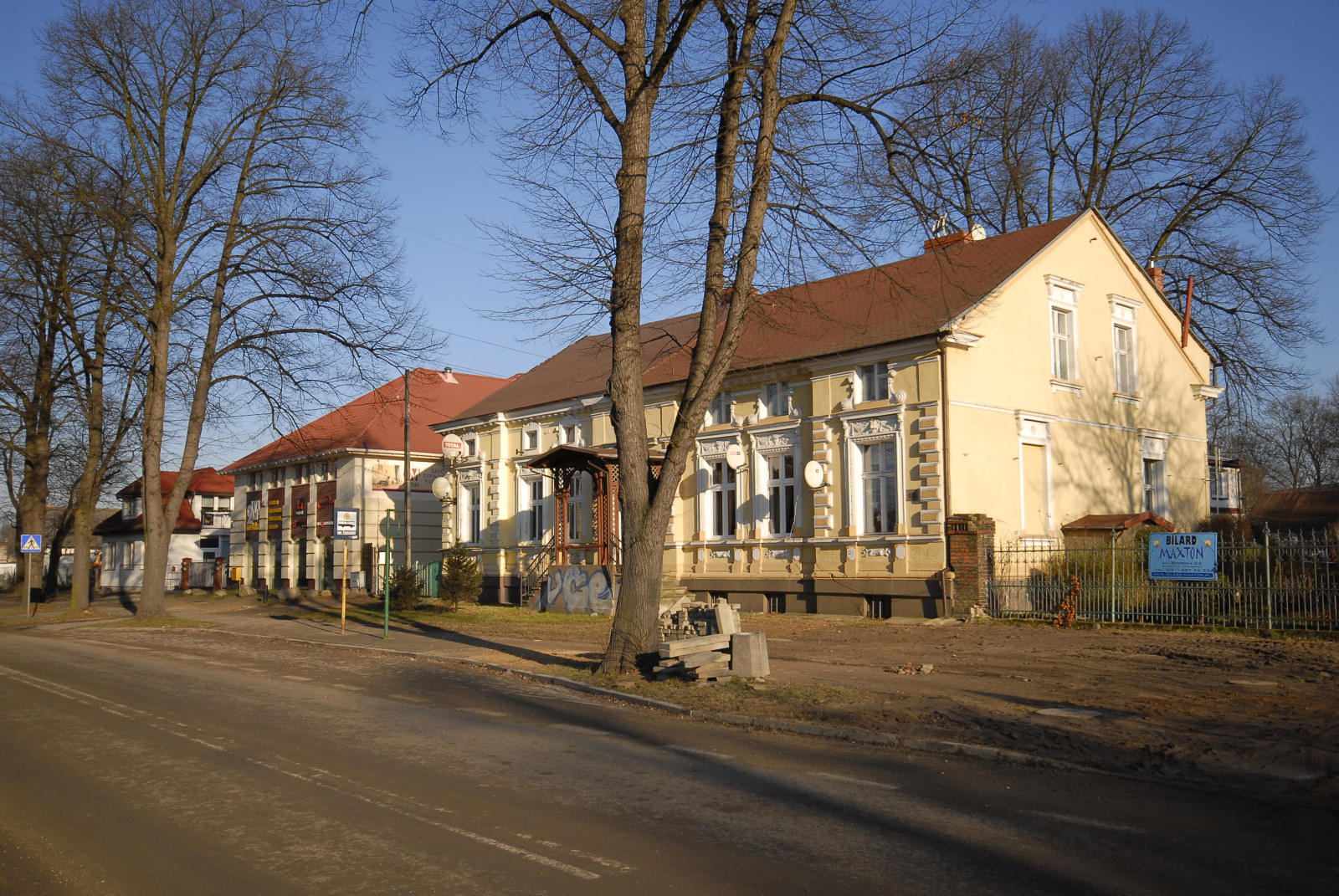
- The houses on Szeroka Street in Krzekowo-Bezrzecze.

- The location of Krzekowo-Bezrzecze within Szczecin.
- Coordinates: 53°26′57″N 14°29′26″E
- Country: Poland
- Voivodeship: West Pomeranian
- City and county: Szczecin
- District: West

Area
  - Total: 3.82 km^{2} (1.47 sq mi)

Population (2025)
  - Total: 5,163
- Time zone: UTC+1 (CET)
  - Summer (DST): UTC+2 (CEST)
- Area code: +48 91
- Car plates: ZS

Krzekowo-Bezrzecze (Polish: [kʂɛˈkɔ.vɔ bɛzˈʐɛ.t͡ʂɛ]) is an administrative neighbourhood forming a subdivision of the West district in the city of Szczecin, Poland. The area features two small residential areas, consisting of single-family detached homes and teraced houes. It includes the neighbourhoods of Krzekowo in the south and Bezrzecze in the north. It has an area of 3.82 km^{2} (1.47 sq mi), and in 2025, it had a population of 5,163 people. The neighbourhood features the Holy Trinity Church, a Roman Catholic parish church dating to the 13th century, from before 1261.

The oldest known artifacts of human activity in the area date to the Mesolithic period, while the oldest known settlements date to the Neolithic period. The area also included a settlement of the Lusatian culture, and later the Hallstatt culture, during the Bronze Age, as well as during the Early Middle Ages, with settlements from between 6th and 7th centuries, from the turn of the 10th century, and from the 13th century. The oldest known records of the hamlet of Krzekowo date to 1640, and Bezrzecze date to 1260. Both settlements formed small farming communities. The latter was plundered and destroyed in 1480 during a raid by the Margraviate of Brandenburg, in 1630 and 1636 during the Dano–Swedish War, and in 1677 during the Thirty Years' War. The area was incorporated into the city of Szczecin in 1939. In 1945, Bezrzecze again became a separate hamlet in 1945, with its eastern portion being incorporated into the city of Szczecin, forming the neighbourhood of Bezrzecze.

== Toponymy ==
Krzekowo-Bezrzecze combines the names of the two neighbourhoods forming it, Krzekowo and Bezrzecze. The former comes from comes from the Old Polish words krzekać and krzekotać, related to the modern Polish word skrzeczeć, meaning "to squawk" and "to screech", referring to the sounds made by frogs which were numerous in the area. The latter comes from Polish words "bez rzeki", meaning "without a river".

== History ==
In the Neolithic period, the modern area included four human settlements present alongside the Bukowa stream. Several tools dating to that period were discovered, including four axes, chisel, and an arrowhead. A flint tool was from the Paleolithic period was also found. The area also included settlements of the Lusatian culture, and later the Hallstatt culture, during the Bronze Age. Around 160 ceramic pieces and a glass beaded necklace, dating to the latter period, were found in the area. A cemetery of the Lusatian culture was also discovered. A dugout canoe of an unspecified age was also found in Bezrzecze. In the Early Middle Ages, the human settlements from the 6th and 7th centuries, from the turn of the 10th century, and from the 13th century were also present, with 133 pieces of ceramics and arrowheads being discovered. The archeological findings came from the areas around Sosabowskiego and Łukasińskiego Streets.

The hamlet of Krzekowo (German: Kreckow) was founded in the 13th century, with its oldest records dating to 1240. The oldest records of the nearby hamlet of Bezrzecze (German: Brunn, earlier Beseritz) date to 1260. At the time, Krzekowo paid a tithe tax to duke Barnim I, the ruler of the Duchy of Pomerania-Stettin, from 30 voloks of land (approximately 537 ha), which it held as a fiefdom from Konrad III, the bishop of Cammin. In 1266, duke Barnim I, granted the ownership of Bezrzecze, together with 53 voloks (951.62 ha) of land, to the St. Mary Church in the nearby city of Szczecin. It was approved the next year by Hermann von Gleichen, the bishop of Cammin. In 1269, a portion of the land of Bezrzecze was granted to brothers Godekin and Heinemann von Saltzwedel, and a year later, 10 voloks (179.55 ha) of land was given to Dietrich von Saltzwedel. In 1277, the ownership of Krzekowo together with its 60 voloks of land (approximately 1,074 ha) were granted by duke Barnim I to the city of Szczecin (Stettin). The hamlet begun paying the taxes to the city, while its residents received the rights and privileges of its citizens. The ownership of the Krzekowo was reconfirmed by duke Bogislaw IV in 1293, Otto I in 1308, and duke Wartislaw IV in 1308.

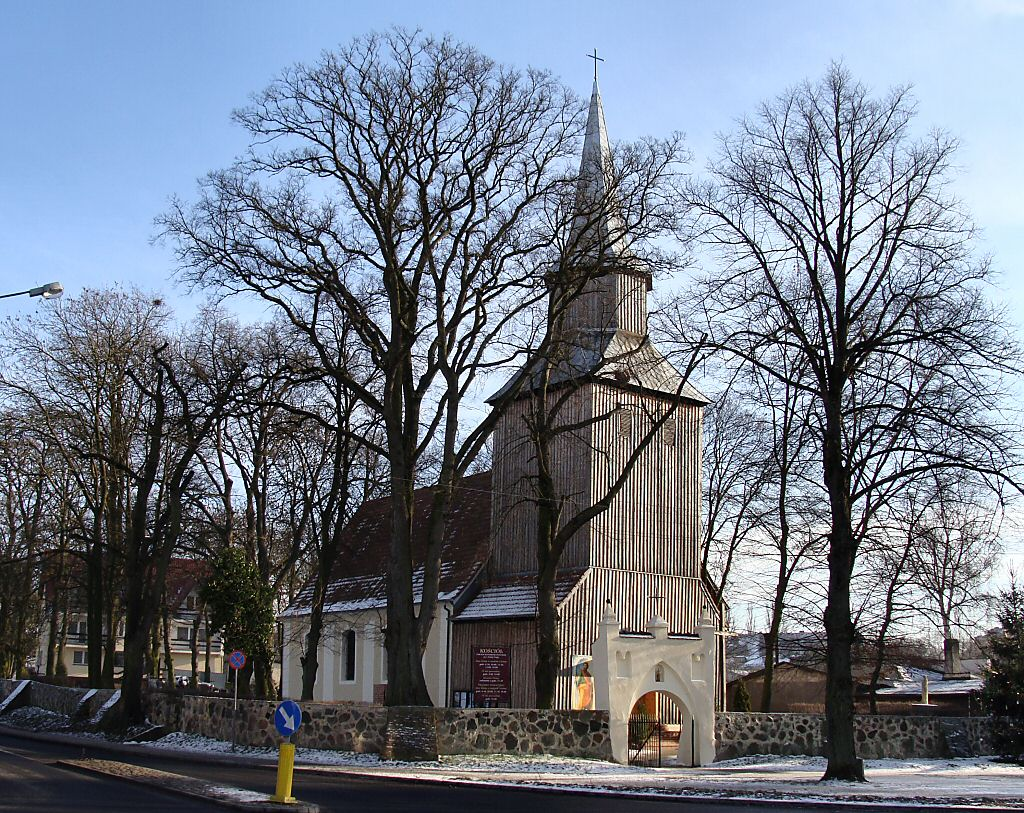
The Holy Trinity Church in Krzekowo, built in the 13th century, before 1261.

By the 13th century, Bezrzecze and Krzekowo each included a Roman Catholic church building, now known as the Our Lady of the Rosary Church, and the Holy Trinity Church, respectively. The latter was built prior to 1261. In 1286, Hermann von Gleichen, the bishop of Cammin, granted the administration over both of them to the St. Mary Church in Szczecin. The church in Bezrzecze was burned down in 1480, during a raid by the soldiers from the Margraviate of Brandenburg, and was rebuilt later that century, with a Late Gothic structure made from granite stones. In the 16th century, their denominations were changed to Lutheranism during the Protestant Reformation. The church in Krzekowo was expanded in 1729, including the construction of a steeple tower made from wood and bricks, while the church in Bezrzecze was expanded in tehg 1890s, with the addition of a Gothic Revival bell tower. Following the end of the Second World War, their denomination were changed again to Roman Catholism after 1945, including 1949 in the case of the Holy Trinity Church, which also became a seat of a parish. The Our Lady of the Rosary Church also became a seat of a parish in 1997.

Following the secularisation of the church lands in the Duchy of Pomerania, Bezrzecze was granted as a fiefdom by duke Bogislaw X to knight Henning Lindstedt from Hagen in 1480. In 1527, it belonged to Vivigenzow I von Eickstedt, and in 1589, it was acquired by Otto von Ramin, a chancellor in the Duchy of Pomerania-Stettin, who came from the Ramin family, which belonged to the regional aristocracy.

In 1630, during the Thirty Years' War and the Dano–Swedish War, the Swedish Imperial Army based a garrison at the outskirts of Szczecin. A manor house in Bezrzecze was used as the temporary headquarters and residence of king Gustavus Adolphus and his officers. The residents fled the hamlet, with the houses being deconstructed by the soldiers as a source of wood for the construction of a military camp. Western Pomerania was recaptured in 1635, with a garrison of the Imperial Army of the Holy Roman Emperor stationed in Bezrzecze until 1636, under the command of field marshal general Rodolfo Giovanni Marazzino. Bezrzecze was again plundered by the military, and was later recaptured by the Swedish military in 1636, which stationed there until 1639.

Following the death of Otto von Ramin in 1641, Bezrzecze was inherited by his wife, Armigard von Ramin, who financed the reconstruction of the hamlet and the plundered manor house. Bezrzecze and its manor house were again plundered and burned down on 20 October 1657, by the Crown Army of the Polish–Lithuanian Commonwealth, under the command of field crown hetman Stefan Czarniecki. They were rebuilt, being financed by Armigard von Ramin, and her brother-in-law Adam Friedrich von Bornstedt. The hamlet was once again burned down in 1677 during the siege of Stettin in the Scanian War. Both Armigard von Ramin and Adam Friedrich von Bornstedt died in 1677.

In 1692, Bezrzecze housed seven landowners, while the population of Krzekowo in the 17th century included ten landowners and two smallholders. In the 18th century, its farmers leased the pastures in Bezrzecze, paying 16 bushels of rye (1025.28 litres) annually. The owner of Krzekowo also held the exclusive right to fish in the nearby Głębokie Lake. Due to the large presence of fish such as northern pike, European perch, and Common rudds, the city of Szczecin, as well as residents of Krzekowo contested the exclusivity in the court against the Ramin family. The land administrator of Krzekowo paid 500 thalers of an annual tithe tax to the city of Szczecin, while every farmer paid 246 bushels (15,763.68 litres) of Secale grain and 222 bushels (14,225.76 litres) of Avena grain. Every farmer and smallholder was obliged to work for three days for the land administrator.

In the 18th century, Bezrzecze included a brickworks, which produced 140,000 bricks annually. The marl, medicinal clay, and peat were also excavated in the area. In 1828, Bezrzecze was granted the status of the knight estate. In the first half of the 19th century, the landed estate of Bezrzecze, which also included the nearby hamlets of Gunice and Stangenhorst, had an area of 4,592 Magdeburg morgen (1172.44 ha), the majority of which consisted of farmlands, dedicated to the cultivation of wheat, rye, oat, beans, and potatoes. The hamlet itself measured 480 Magdeburg morgen (122.55 ha), and its population included four landowners, each of whom owned 120 Magdeburg morgen (30.64 ha). In 1892, the estate of Bezrzecze, together with Głębokie and Stangenhorst, had an area of 1,013 ha, including 346 ha of farmlands, 84 ha of meadows, and 81 ha of pastures. The woods covered 462 ha, and the water covered 40 ha. In 1894, Bezrzecze had a population of 260 people in 20 households. The majority of its residents were of Lutheran faith, with the settlement also including seven followers of Judaism. It also included a primary school.

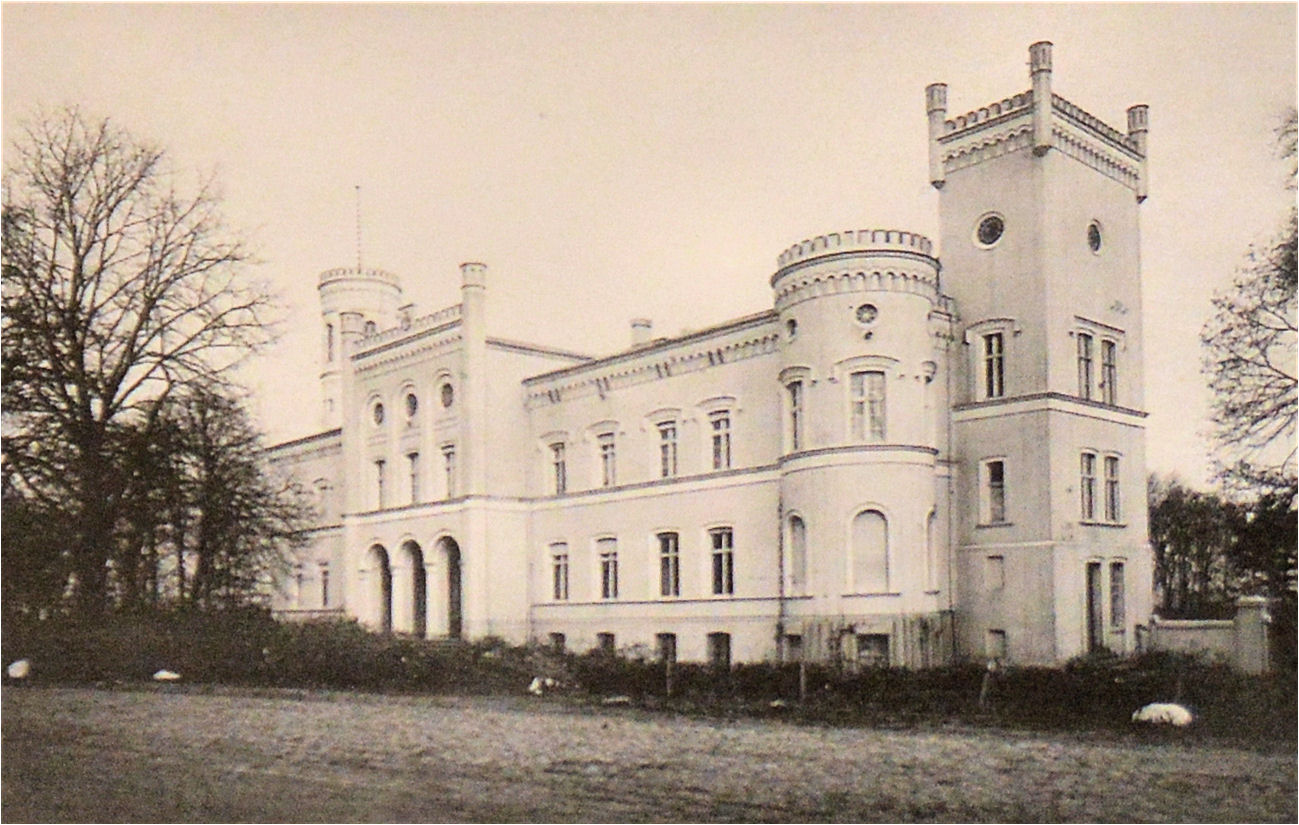
The Bezrzecze Palace, built in 1880, and burned down in 1946.

In 1880, a Baroque Revival palace was built in Bezrzecze for its administrator, Otto Friedrich Gebhard von Ramin, in place of the former manor house of the Ramin family. It burned down in 1946. Its garden complex has been preserved to the present day, being included on the regional heritage list.

In the 19th century, the barracks complex of the Prussian Army was developed in the area between the current Żołnierska, Klonowica, and Wernyhory Streets, to the east of Krzekowo. A large military training area, named the Krzekowo Filed (German: Kreckower Feld), was created to the north of the barracks. In 1862, it included ten residential buildings, as well as other military structures. It was expanded in the following decades. In 1897, it had five residential barracks, as well as gastronomical buildings, bathhouses, horse stables, administrative buildings, and warehouses. In 1910, the entire complex had an area of 362.94 ha. In the following years, it was expanded with buildings on Klonowica Street. The military also owned nearby shooting ranges at the intersection of the current Polish Armed Forces Avenue and Szeroka Street. The complex was visited by emperor Wilhelm I on 13 October 1897. Around 1930, a new barracks complex was developed to the south, at the corner of the current Łukasińskiego and Sosabowskiego Streets for the infantry soldiers. Between 1935 and 1936, new barracks were constructed in the complex, between the current Klonowica, Janickiego, Mickiewicza, and Żołnierska Streets.

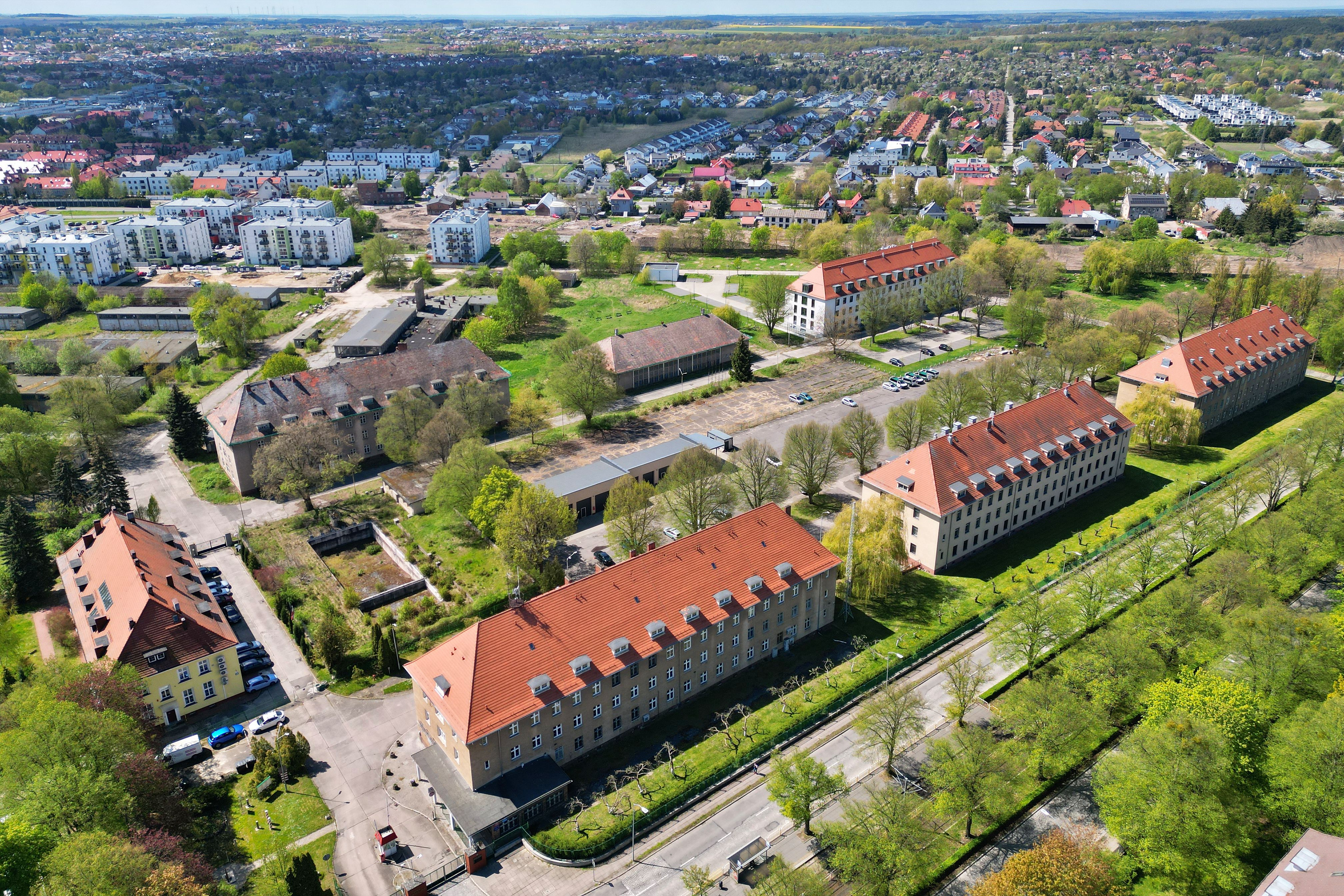
The former military barracks complex at Żołnierska Street, founded in the 19th century to the west of Krzekowo.

In 1909, a military airfield was opened at the military training area, becoming the first airfield of Szczecin. The same year, the Wright brothers, presented their aircraft Wright Flyer III at the airfield, in an air show open to the public. They were two aviation pioneers generally credited with inventing, building, and flying the world's first successful airplane in 1903. On 18 June 1910, the first aviation accident with a civilian fatality in the history of Germany, as well as the first in Szczecin, took place at the airfield. Thaddäus Robl, a cyclist and pilot, died after the Farman III pusher biplane, which he piloted, crashed onto the runway during landing. The airfield hosted airshows annually. It was used by the German Air Combat Forces during the First World War, and closed in 1918. It was reopened in 1920 as a civilian aerodrome, with flights to Berlin, Copenhagen, Gdańsk, Klaipėda, Stockholm, and Riga. A branch of Berlin-based flight school was opened there in 1923, and a weather station was opened in 1924. The aerodrome was closed down in 1931, due to presence of the Szczecin Dąbie Airfield founded in 1927. In the 1970s, the housing estate of Zawadzkiego-Klonowica, consisting of apartment buildings, was developed in place of the former military training area and the airfield. Since 1990, it forms a separate administrative neighbourhood.

After the end of the Second World II in 1945, the northern barracks complex on Żołnierska Street begun briefly housing soldiers of the Red Army of the Soviet Union, and later the soldiers of the Polish Land Forces, which used it until 2002. In 1995, the building at 47 Żołnierska Street begun housing the Faculty of Economics of the Szczecin University of Technology, which was replaced by the West Pomeranian University of Technology in 2009. The campus was expanded in the following decades, currently housing faculties and buildings of the Maritime University of Szczecin, the Pomeranian Medical University, and the West Pomeranian University of Technology. It also houses the West Pomeranian Business School, a private university founded in 1989, located at 53 Żołnierska Street. The southern complex on Łukasińskiego Street continues to be used by the military, since 1999, housing the headquarters of the Multinational Corps Northeast of NATO. Since 1990, the area belongs administratively to the neighbourhood of Pogodno.

In 1820, following a legal dispute ending with the abolition of serfdom in Krzekowo, the city of Szczecin was ordered to grant them 1,726 morgen (440.7 ha) of land. During the interwar period, a suburb of single-family houses was developed to the east of Bezrzecze, between the current Modra, Rozmarynowa, and Zaściankowa Streets. In 1932, the timber-framed houses, situated next to the settlement administrator building, were demolished. In 1939, aside from the Ramin family's estate, the hamlet also included another landed estate, with an area of 42 ha, owned by Elsbeth Meyer. Bezrzecze had a population of 244 people in 1925, and 249 people in 1933.

On 15 October 1939, Bezrzecze and Krzekowo were incorporated into the city of Szczecin. At the time, the former had a population of 1,217 residents. On 26 April 1945, during the Second World War, the area was captured by the 2nd Shock Army of the 2nd Belorussian Front, a part of the Red Army of the Soviet Union. The city was placed under the Polish administration on 5 July 1945, while its suburbs, including Krzekowo and Berzecze, were placed under the Soviet military occupation. The area was returned under the Polish control on 4 October 1945, with Krzekowo being incorporated back into the city. The German population either left or was forced out from the city, and was replaced by Polish settlers. The land in the area, which predominantly constituted the property of landowners such as the Ramin family, was confiscated and nationalised by the government. On 5 October 1954, the eastern side of the hamlet was reincorporated into the city, forming the neighbourhood of Bezrzecze. It also became alternatively known as Bezrzecze Dolne (lit. 'Lower Bezrzecze'), while the remaining hamlet became known as Bezrzecze Górne (lit. 'Upper Bezrzecze'). Their boundaries were marked by Drozdowa, Kirasjerów, Koralowa, Poranna, Wronia, and Zaściankowa Streets, together with the adjacent building. The historic church, as well as the garden complex of the former Bezrzecze Palace, remained within the hamlet.

In 1948, the tram line tracks were built in the east of Krzekowo, alongside Żołnierska Street, with a turning loop built in 1954 near the intersection with Klonowica Street. In 2024, the loop was demolished, and the line was extended to the north alongside Sosabowskiego and Szafera Streets.

From 1955 to 1976, the neighbourhoods of Krzekowo and Bezrzecze formed two of the administrative subdivisions of the Nad Odrą district. In 1960, they had 1,231 and 719 residents, respectively. On 28 November 1990, the neighbourhood of Krzekowo-Bezrzecze was established as one of the administrative subdivisions of the West district, being governed by an elected council.

In the 1960s, a series of greenhouses were developed in the neighbourhood, alongside Szeroka Street. In 1970, Krzekowo had a population of 650 people.

In 2019, a bronze statue dedicated to Wojtek (1942–1963), a Syrian brown bear which accompanied the 2nd Polish Corps during the Second World War, was unveiled in Krzekowo. It was placed at the Wojtek the Bear Square, at the corner of Misia Wojtka and Żyzna Streets. The sculpture was designed by Bogdan Ronin-Walknowski.

== Characteristics ==
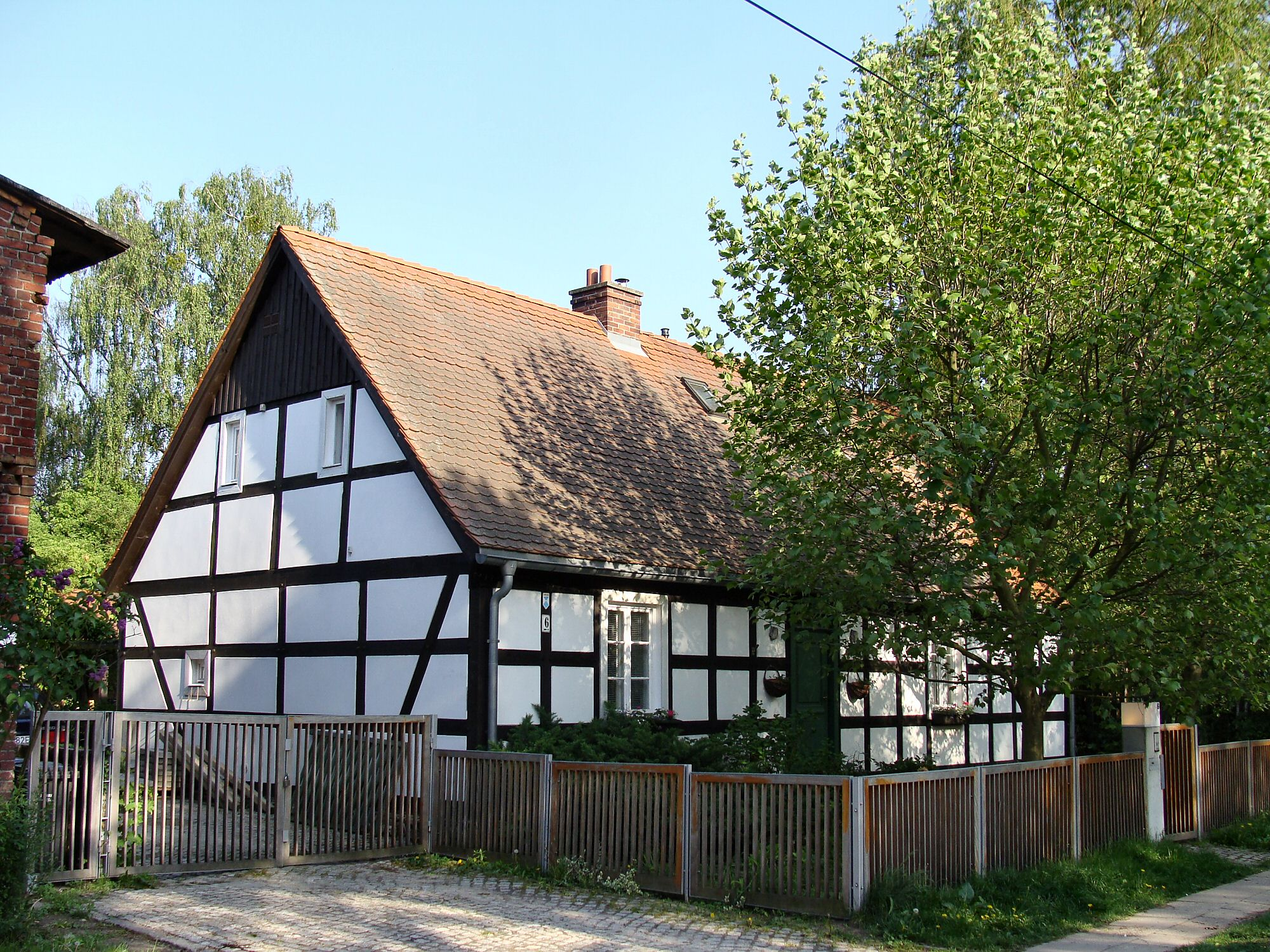
The timber-framed house at 6 Szeroka Street in Krzekowo, dating to 1895.

Krzekowo-Bezrzecze is a residential area with single-family detached homes and terraced houses. It consists of the neighbourhoods of Krzekowo in the south and Bezrzecze in the north. It features the Holy Trinity Church, a Roman Catholic parish church dating to the 13th century, from before 1261, which is located at 1A Żołnierska Street. The neighbourhood also includes a timber-framed house, located at 6 Szeroka Street, which, dating to 1895, is one of the oldest buildings in the area, and a 5-storey brick mill and residential building at 19 and 19A Szeroka Street, dating to 1928. Additionally, the neighbourhood also includes a bronze statue dedicated to Wojtek (1942–1963), a Syrian brown bear which accompanied the 2nd Polish Corps during the Second World War. It is placed at the Wojtek the Bear Square, at the corner of Misia Wojtka and Żyzna Streets. The sculpture was designed by Bogdan Ronin-Walknowski, and unveiled in 2019.

Krzekowo-Bezrzecze is passed through by the Bukowa stream, which flows to the south towards the Oder river. In the east, it is also crossed through by the tram line tracks alongside Żołnierska, Sosabowskiego, and Szafera Streets.

Bezrzecze lies on the municipal boundary, bordering the hamlet of Bezrzecze in Police County to the west. Their boundary is marked by Drozdowa, Kirasjerów, Koralowa, Poranna, Wronia, and Zaściankowa Streets, together with the adjacent buildings.

== Demographics ==
Historical population
Year	2001	2002	2003	2004	2005	2007	2008	2009	2010	2011	2012	2013	2014	2015	2016	2017	2018	2019	2020	2021	2022	2023	2024	2025
Pop.	2,376	2,393	2,705	2,821	3,039	3,415	3,436	3,468	3,495	3,586	3,694	3,741	3,867	3,974	4,009	4,190	4,308	4,449	4,718	4,867	4,960	5,032	5,104	5,163
±%	—	+0.7%	+13.0%	+4.3%	+7.7%	+12.4%	+0.6%	+0.9%	+0.8%	+2.6%	+3.0%	+1.3%	+3.4%	+2.8%	+0.9%	+4.5%	+2.8%	+3.3%	+6.0%	+3.2%	+1.9%	+1.5%	+1.4%	+1.2%

== Government and boundaries ==
Krzekowo-Bezrzecze is one of the nine administrative neighbourhoods forming subdivisions of the West district in the city of Szczecin, Poland. It is governed by a locally elected neighbourhood council with 15 members, and a board of administrators with 5 members, the latter chosen internally. Its seat is located at 1A Klonowica Street. Krzekowo-Bezrzecze borders the neighbourhoods of Głębokie-Pilchowo to the north, Pogodno and Zawadzkiego-Klonowica to the east, and Gumieńce to the south. To the west, it borders the municipality of Dobra Szczecińska in Police County, with the hamlet of Bezrzecze. Its are approximately determined by Koralowa Street, Drozdowa Street, Wronia Street, Łukasińskiego Street, the city border, the boundaries of the neighbourhoods of Głębokie-Pilchowo, Gumieńce, Pogodno, and Zawadzkiego-Klonowica. The neighbourhood has the total area of 3.8 km^{2} (1.47 sq mi).
