= Telesfor Badetko Memorial =

Monument in Szczecin, Poland

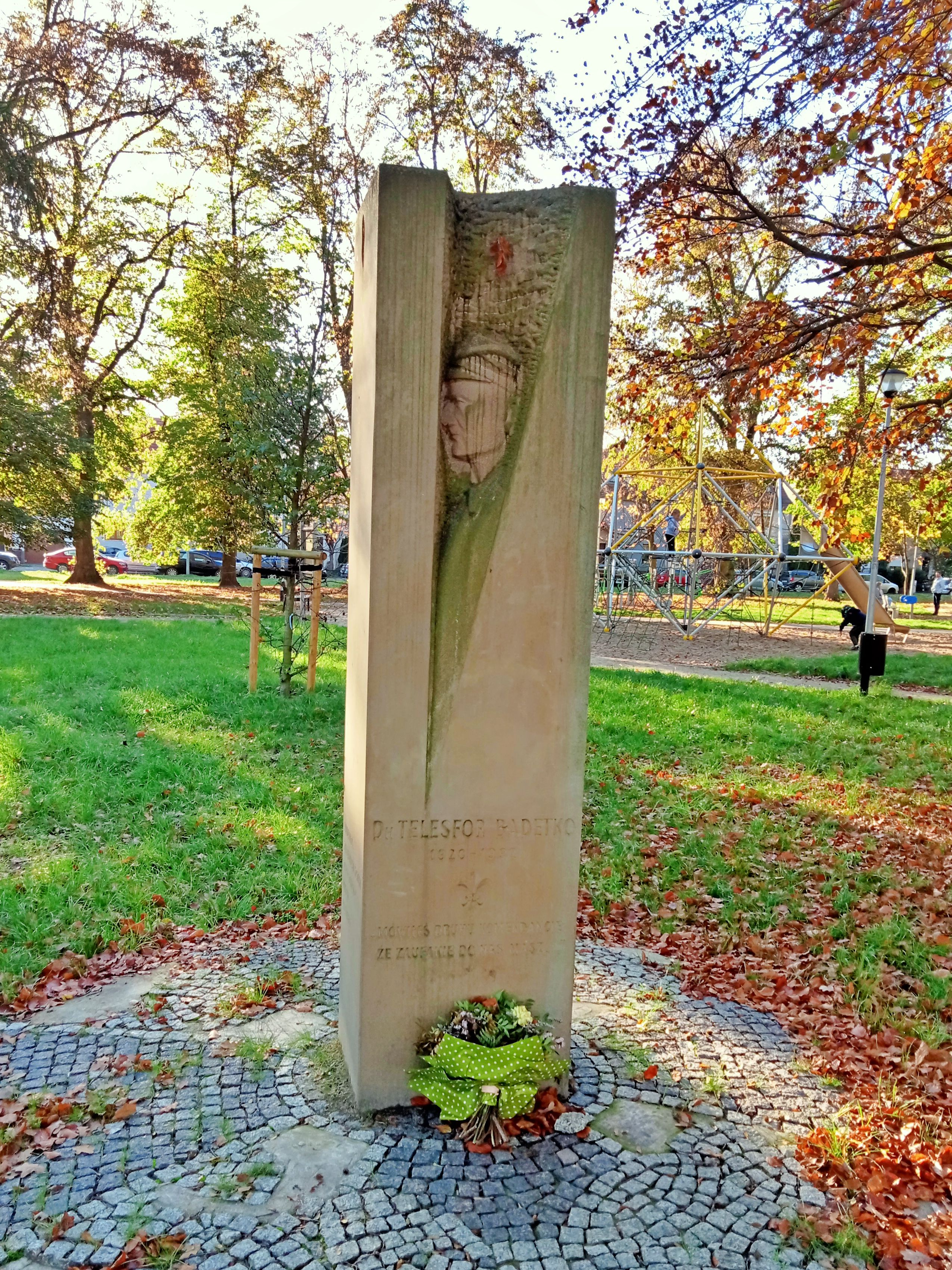
- The monument in 2022.
- Interactive map of Telesfor Badetko Memorial
- Location: Telesfor Badetko Square, Szczecin, Poland
- Coordinates: 53°26′36.5″N 14°31′33.7″E
- Designer: Janina Jeleńska-Papp
- Type: Obelisk, relief
- Material: Sandstone
- Length: 0.6 m (2 ft 0 in)
- Width: 0.5 m (1 ft 8 in)
- Height: 2.5 m (8 ft 2 in)
- Opening date: 9 May 1999
- Dedicated to: Telesfor Badetko

The Telesfor Badetko Memorial (Polish pronunciation: [tɛˈlɛs.fɔr baˈdɛt.kɔ]; Polish: Pomnik Telesfora Badetki) is a monument in Szczecin, Poland, located within the neighbourhood of Łękno in the Downtown district. It is placed at the Telesfor Badetko Square, at the corner of Polish Armed Forces Avenue and Bohdana Zaleskiego Street. The monument commemorates Telesfor Badetko (1920–1992), a 20th-century military officer who served in the Grey Ranks and Home Army as part of the Polish resistance movement in German-occupied Poland during the Second World War. Prior to, and after the war, he was active in the Polish Scouting and Guiding Association, including founding and being the first leader of its district in the neighbourhood of Pogodno in Szczecin. It was sculptured by Janina Jeleńska-Papp, and unveiled on 9 May 1999. It has a form of a sandstone obelisk with the height of 2.5 m, with the triangular cutout on its front side, with the relief of the bust of Telesfor Badetko inside of it.

== History ==
The monument is dedicated to Telesfor Badetko (1920–1992), a 20th-century military officer who served in the Grey Ranks and Home Army as part of the Polish resistance movement in German-occupied Poland during the Second World War. Prior to, and after the war, he was active in the Polish Scouting and Guiding Association, including founding and being the first leader of its district in the neighbourhood of Pogodno in Szczecin. The memorial was sculpted by Janina Jeleńska-Papp in Kraków in 1988. It was unveiled on 9 May 1999, at the garden square at the corner of Polish Armed Forces Avenue and Bohdana Zaleskiego Street, which was named in honour of Badetko in 1996.

== Characteristics ==
The monument is placed at the Telesfor Badetko Square, at the corner of Polish Armed Forces Avenue and Bohdana Zaleskiego Street. It has a form of a sandstone obelisk, with the height of 2.5 m, and rectangular base with the dimensions of 0.6 m × 0.5 m. The front side includes a triangular cutout, with the relief of the bust of Telesfor Badetko inside of it, depicted wearing a scouting rogatywka hat and a raincoat. It is arranged with the side profile towards the opening. Below the cutout, the side also features two inscription in Polish, separated by fleur-de-lis. They read "DH Telesfor Badetko 1920–1992", and "Mówiłeś druhu komendancie, że zaufanie do nas masz…". It translates to "Scout Telesfor Badetko 1920–1992", and "You said, scout commander, that you placed your trust in us…". The left side features the inscription which reads "Fundatorzy: Zarząd Miasta Szczecin, Zespół Szkół nr 4, rodzina, przyjaciele", and translates to "The fundators: the Management Board of the City of Szczecin, the School Complex no. 4, family, and friends". The right side is inscribed with text which reads "A.D. 1998". The obelisk is placed on a base made from granite paving stones, arranged in two colours in the shape of the scouting cross, the symbol of the Polish Scouting and Guiding Association.
