= Zawadzkiego-Klonowica =

Neighbourhood of Szczecin, Poland

- Administrative neighbourhood
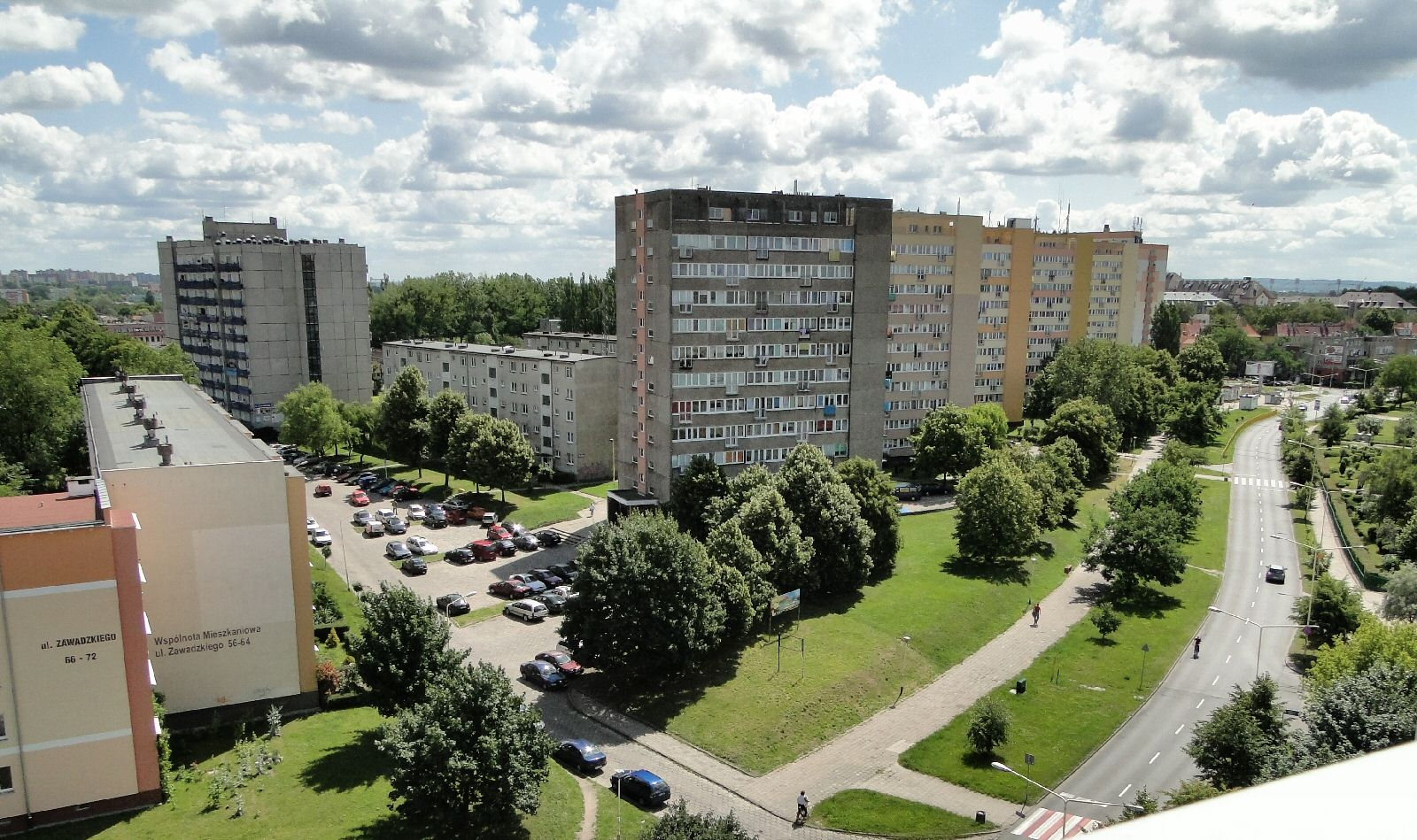
- The apartment buildings on Zawadzkiego Street.

- The location of Zawadzkiego-Klonowica within Szczecin.
- Coordinates: 53°26′48.1″N 14°30′56.8″E
- Country: Poland
- Voivodeship: West Pomeranian
- City and county: Szczecin
- District: West
- Seat: 246 Polish Armed Forces Avenue

Area
  - Total: 1.58 km^{2} (0.61 sq mi)

Population (2025)
  - Total: 10,151
  - Density: 6,420/km^{2} (16,600/sq mi)
- Time zone: UTC+1 (CET)
  - Summer (DST): UTC+2 (CEST)
- Area code: +48 91
- Car plates: ZS

Zawadzkiego-Klonowica (Polish: [za.vat͡sˈkiɛ.ɡɔ klɔ.nɔˈvi.t͡sa]) is an administrative neighborhood of the city of Szczecin, Poland, within the West district. Its a housing estate with mid- and high-rise apartment buildings. The neighbourhood has an area of 1.58 km^{2} (0.61 sq mi), and in 2025, was inhabited by 10,151 people. The neighbourhood also includes the sports facilities, such as the Netto Arena, the Wiesław Maniak Municipal Athletics Stadium, and the Zbysław Zając Velodrome. It also features the Church of the Annunciation of the Lord, built in 1997.

In the 19th century, the military training area, known as the Krzekowo Field, was developed within the boundaries of the modern neighborhood, as part of the complex of the barracks of the Prussian Army in the nearby Krzekowo. In 1909, a military airfield was opened at the military training area, becoming the first airfield of Szczecin. It was closed in 1918, and reopened as a civilian aerodrome in 1920, which operated until 1931. The sports venues of the Wiesław Maniak Municipal Athletics Stadium and the Zbysław Zając Velodrome, were opened in the area in the 1900s and in 1925, respectively. The area was incorporated into the city in 1939. In the 1970s, the housing estate with apartment buildings was developed in its place.

== Toponymy ==
The neighbourhood is named after its two main roads, Zawadzkiego Street and Klonowica Street. They in turn were named after Tadeusz Zawadzki, member of the Polish resistance movement during the Second World War, and Sebastian Klonowic, a 16th-century poet and composer.

== History ==
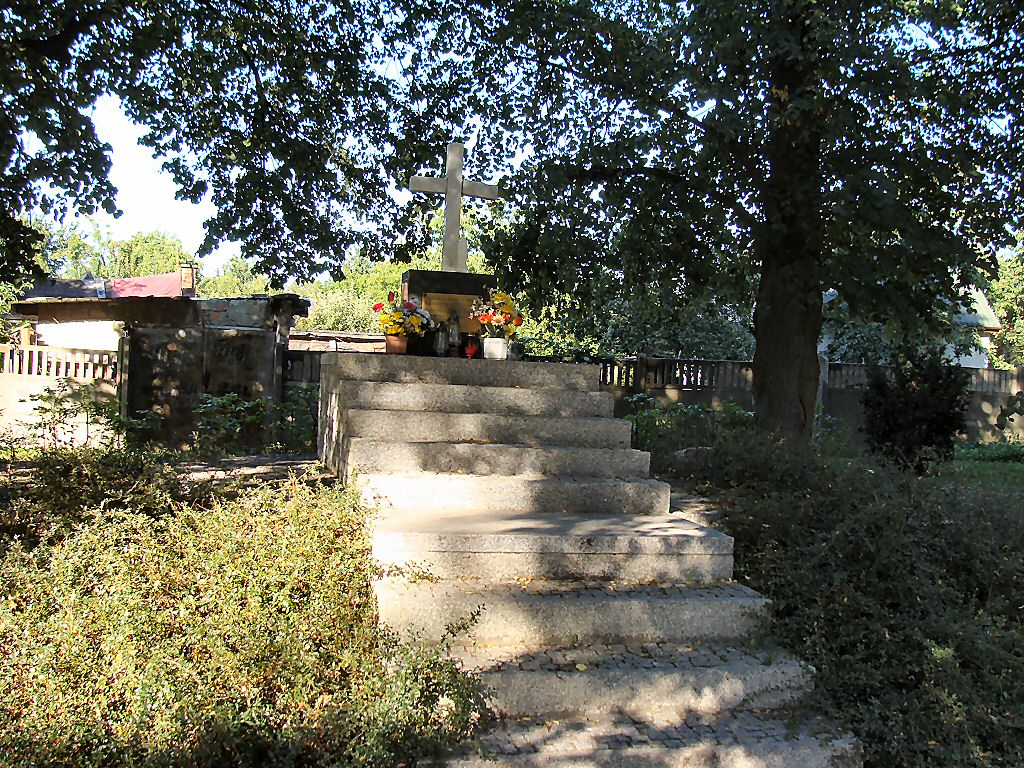
The French prisoners of war cemetery on Litewska Street, erected in 1870.

In the 19th century, a complex of barracks of the Prussian Army was developed in the area between the current Żołnierska, Klonowica, and Wernyhory Streets, to the east of Krzekowo. A large military training area, named the Krzekowo Filed (German: Kreckower Feld), was created to the north of the barracks. In 1862, it included ten residential buildings, as well as other military structures. It was expanded in the following decades. In 1910, the entire complex had an area of 362.94 ha. In 1870, during the Franco–Prussian War, a prisoner-of-war camp was built at the military training area, for the captured French soldiers. Over six hounded of them died in the camp, of which, 248 were buried on a cemetery dedicated to them, built nearby on the current Litewska Street. The complex of barracks was visited by Wilhelm I, the Emperor of Germany, on 13 October 1897.

In 1909, a military airfield was opened at the military training area, becoming the first airfield of Szczecin. The same year, the Wright brothers, presented their aircraft Wright Flyer III at the airfield, in an air show open to the public. They were two aviation pioneers generally credited with inventing, building, and flying the world's first successful airplane in 1903. On 18 June 1910, the first aviation accident with a civilian fatality in the history of Germany, as well as the first in Szczecin, took place at the airfield. Thaddäus Robl, a cyclist and pilot, died after the Farman III pusher biplane, which he piloted, crashed onto the runway during landing. The airfield hosted airshows annually. It was used by the German Air Combat Forces during the First World War, and closed in 1918. It was reopened in 1920 as a civilian aerodrome, with flights to Berlin, Copenhagen, Gdańsk, Klaipėda, Stockholm, and Riga. A branch of Berlin-based flight school was opened there in 1923, and a weather station was opened in 1924. The aerodrome was closed down in 1931, due to presence of the Szczecin Dąbie Airfield founded in 1927.

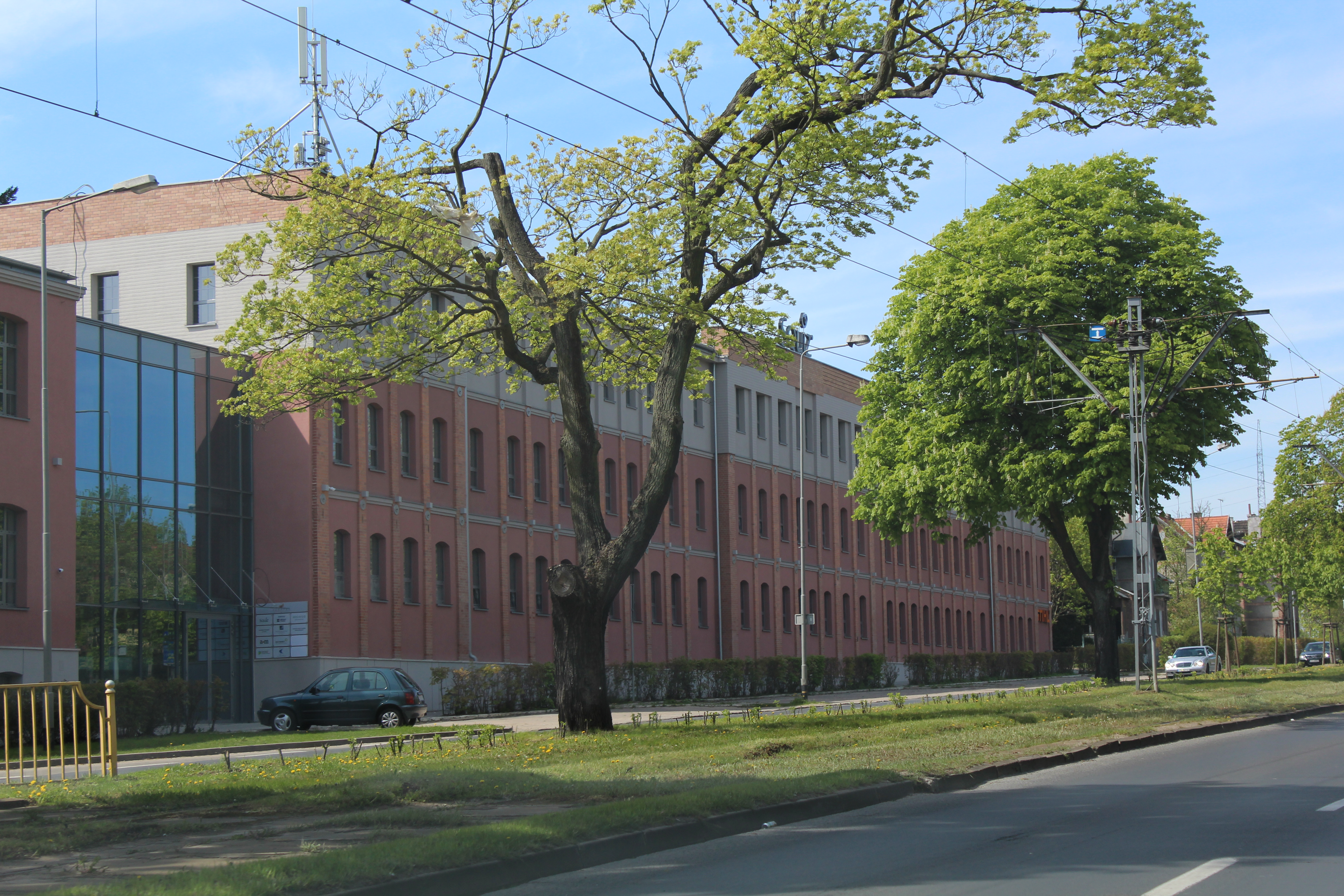
The building of the former POLMO Car Parts Factory, dating to 1899.

In 1899, the Stoewer car factory was opened at 186 Polish Armed Forces Avenue, to the north of the suburb of Pogodno (then known as Neu-Westend). It operated until the end of the Second World War, afterwards being used by for the manufacturing of Ursus tractors, household furniture, and car parts. In 1967, it was renamed to the POLMO Car Parts Factory, and was closed in 2011, being transformed into a shopping centre.

In the 1900s, a sports complex, originally called the Hans Peltzer Arena, and currently known as the Wiesław Maniak Municipal Athletics Stadium, was constructed at 20 Litewska Street. It formed the homefield of the sports club SC Preußen Stettin. After the Second World War, it became mainly an athletics complex. The stadium was renovated and modernised in 2002. It hosted the Polish Athletics Championships in 2002, 2008, and 2014.

In 1925, a velodrome, originally called the Stettin-Westend Municipal Velodrome, and now known as the Zbysław Zając Velodrome, was opened at 246 Polish Armed Forces Avenue. It featured a track measuring 400 m (1312.34 ft). The stadium was renovated in 1987, and again in 1998.

In 1938, the Pogodno tram depot was opened at 200 Polish Armed Forces Avenue was opened the Pogodno tram depot. It was later renovated in 1983.

The area was incorporated into the city of Szczecin on 15 October 1939. On 26 April 1945, during the Second World War, the area was captured by the 2nd Shock Army of the 2nd Belorussian Front, a part of the Red Army of the Soviet Union. The city was placed under the Polish administration on 5 July 1945, while its suburbs were placed under the Soviet military occupation. It was returned under Polish administration and reincorporated into the city on 4 October 1945.

In the 1960s, the army barracks were developed at 250 Polish Armed Forces Avenue, in place of a former military training arae. Since 1996, it houses the 12th Mechanised Brigade of the 12th Mechanised Division, a unit of the Polish Land Forces. Currently, it is located within the boundaries of the neighbourhood of Głębokie-Pilchowo.

In the 1970s, the housing estate of Zawadzkiego-Klonowica was developed between Zawadzkiego, Marlicza, Szafera, and Sosabowskiego Streets, consisting of the mid- and high-rise apartment buildings, constructed in the large-panel-system technique.

Between 1984 and 1997, the Church of the Annunciation of the Lord was built at 2 Św. Kingi Street, becoming the seat of a Roman Catholic parish.

On 28 November 1990, the neighbourhood of Zawadzkiego-Klonowica was established as one of the administrative subdivisions of the West district, being governed by an elected council.

In 2014, Netto Arena, a multipurpose arena complex was built at 3, 5 and 7 Szafera Street.

== Characteristics ==
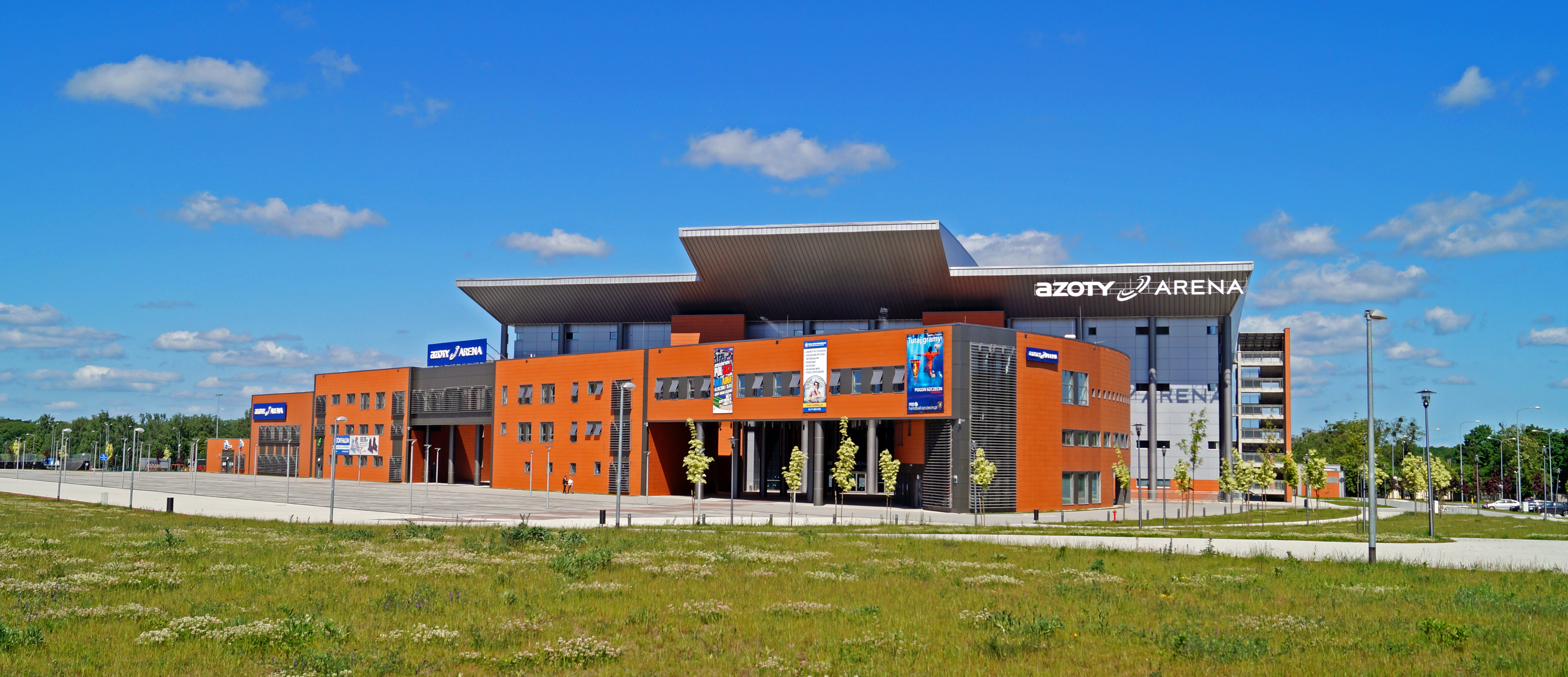
The Netto Arena at 3, 5 and 7 Szafera Street.

Zawadzkiego-Klonowica is a housing estate with the mid- and high-rise apartment buildings, predominantly constructed in the 1970s using the large-panel-system technique. The neighbourhood includes sports facilities, such as the Netto Arena at 3, 5 and 7 Szafera Street, the Wiesław Maniak Municipal Athletics Stadium at 20 Litewska Street, the Zbysław Zając Velodrome at 246 Polish Armed Forces Avenue. It also has the historic building of the POLMO Car Parts Factory at 186 Polish Armed Forces Avenue, now used as a shopping centre.

The neighbourhood includes the Church of the Annunciation of the Lord at 2 Św. Kingi Street, which houses the seat of a Roman Catholic parish. Additionally, a small cemetery for 248 French soldiers deceased in 1870 in a nearby prisoner of war camp, during the Franco–Prussian War, stands on Litewska Street.

Zawadzkiego-Klonowica also features the Pogodno tram depot at 200 Polish Armed Forces Avenue, and Klonowica bus depot at 3C Klonowica Street. Additionally, it also houses the headquarters of the Szczecin Roads and Municipal Transit Management, and Szczecin Trams, at 5 Klonowica Street.

== Demographics ==
Historical population
Year	2008	2009	2010	2011	2012	2013	2014	2015	2016	2017	2018	2019	2020	2021	2022	2023	2024	2025
Pop.	11,459	13,310	12,961	12,835	12,792	12,584	12,420	12,232	11,994	11,789	11,647	11,472	11,234	11,044	10,733	10,548	10,331	10,151
±%	—	+16.2%	−2.6%	−1.0%	−0.3%	−1.6%	−1.3%	−1.5%	−1.9%	−1.7%	−1.2%	−1.5%	−2.1%	−1.7%	−2.8%	−1.7%	−2.1%	−1.7%

== Government and boundaries ==
Zawadzkiego-Klonowica is one of the nine administrative neighbourhoods forming subdivisions of the West district in the city of Szczecin, Poland. It is governed by a locally elected neighbourhood council with 15 members, and a board of administrators with 5 members, the latter chosen internally. Its seat is located at 246 Polish Armed Forces Avenue. The neighbourhood borders Arkońskie-Niemierzyn and Osów to the north east, Głębokie-Pilchowo to the north west, Pogodno to the south, and Krzekowo-Bezrzecze to the west. Its boundaries are approximately determined by Jarzyńskiego Street, Polish Armed Forces Avenue, Szczecin Botanical Garden, Unii Lubelskiej Street, Klonowica Street, Żołnierska Street, Sosabowski Street, and around possessions at Szafera Street. Zawadzkiego-Klonowica has a total area of 1.58 km^{2} (0.61 sq mi).
