= EPSD =

EPSD or ePSD may refer to:

- Española Public School District #55, a school district based in Española, New Mexico, USA
- The electronic Pennsylvania Sumerian Dictionary, an online dictionary of the Sumerian language
- East Penn School District, Pennsylvania
- EPSD, the ICAO code for Szczecin Dąbie Airfield, Poland
