= Statue of Lech Kaczyński (Szczecin) =

Monument in Szczecin, Poland

- The monument in 2018.
- Interactive map of Statue of Lech Kaczyński
- Location: 113 Polish Armed Forces Avenue, Łękno, Szczecin, West Pomeranian Voivodeship, Poland
- Coordinates: 53°26′26.64″N 14°31′55.68″E
- Designer: Stanisław Milewski
- Type: Statue
- Material: Bronze (statue); granite (pedestal)
- Height: 2.1 m (82.7 in)
- Opening date: 16 June 2018
- Dedicated to: Lech Kaczyński

The statue of Lech Kaczyński (Polish pronunciation: [ˈlɛx kaˈt͡ʂɘ̟ɲ.skʲi]; Polish: Pomnik Lecha Kaczyńskiego) is a monument in the city of Szczecin in West Pomeranian Voivodeship, Poland, located within the neighbourhood of Łękno within the Downtown district. It is placed in front of the headquarters of the West Pomeranian Voivodeship branch of the Solidarity trade union on 113 Polish Armed Forces Avenue. It commemorates Lech Kaczyński (1949–2010), a 20th- and 21st-century politician and lawyer who served as the President of Poland from 2005 to 2010. It was designed by Stanisław Milewski, and unveiled on 16 June 2018.

== History ==
On 19 March 2017, the board of directors of the West Pomeranian Voivodeship branch of the Solidarity trade union, voted to donate a portion of the parcel of their head quatres building in Szczecin, for the construction of the monument. It was built in commemoration of Lech Kaczyński (1949–2010), a 20th- and 21st-century politician and lawyer who served as the President of Poland from 2005 until his death in the Smolensk air disaster in 2010. He was also a member of the trade union, and an activist of the anti-government and anti-communist dissident movement in the Polish People's Republic. The monument was designed by sculptor Stanisław Milewski, while the arrangement of the area around it was designed by architect Macieja Płotkowiaka. The statue was cast in the Brązart foundry in the town of Pleszew in Greater Poland Voivodeship. The monument was unveiled on 16 June 2018. The ceremony was attended by Mateusz Morawiecki, the prime minister of Poland, and Mariusz Błaszczak, the Ministry of National Defence. The letters written by Andrzej Duda, the president of Poland, and Jarosław Kaczyński, the leader of the Law and Justice party and Lech Kaczyński's brother, were also read out.

== Characteristics ==
The monument stands in front of the headquarters of the West Pomeranian Voivodeship branch of the of the Solidarity trade union on 113 Polish Armed Forces Avenue. It consists of a bronze statue of Lech Kaczyński depicted wearing a trench coat with a suit underneath. The statue is placed on top of a white stone pedestal. The monument around 2.1 m (82.7 in).
