= Enea Arena =

Indoor arena in Szczecin, Poland

- Arena Szczecin

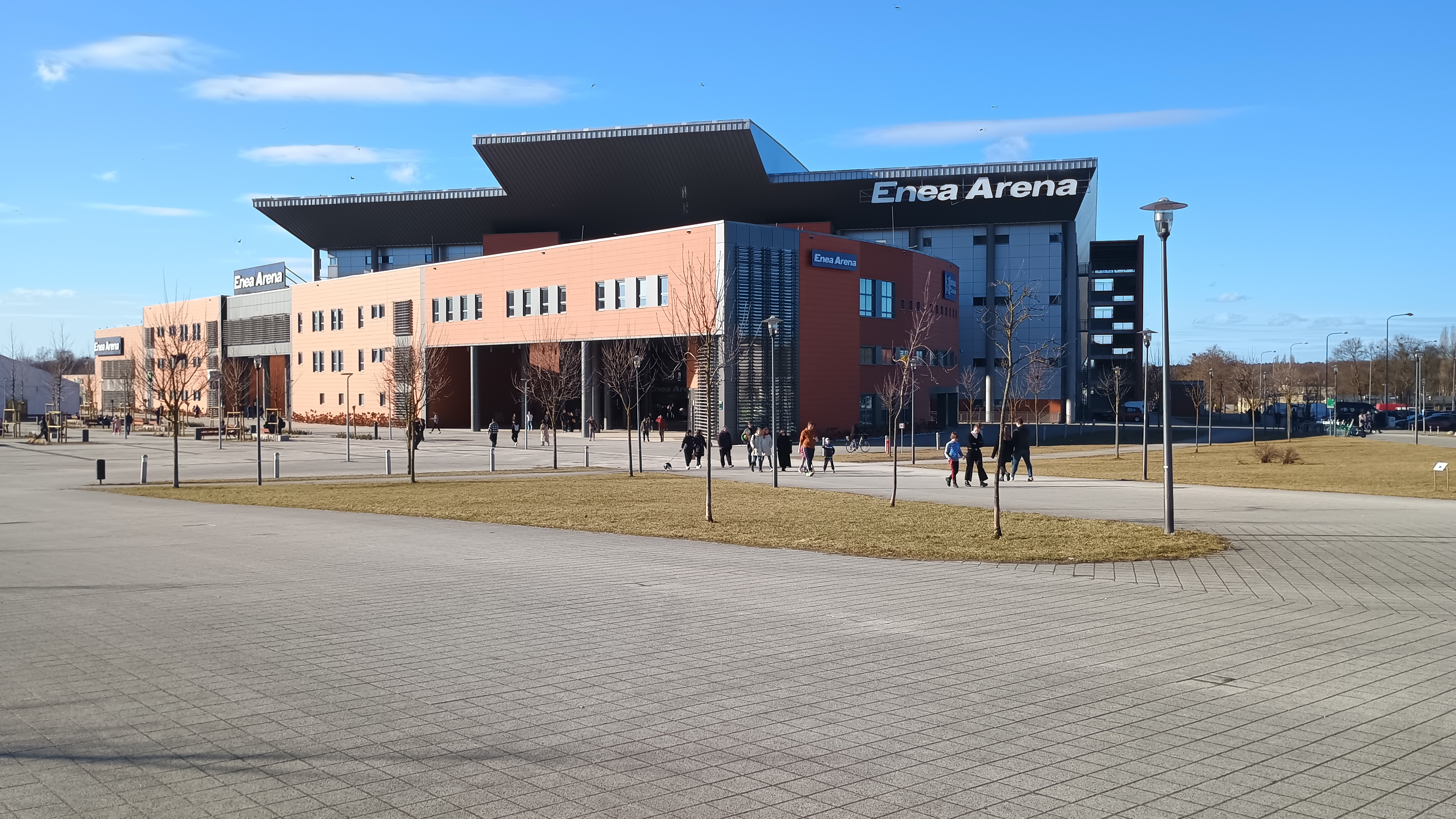
- Enea Arena in 2026
- Interactive map of Enea Arena
- Former names: Azoty Arena (2014–2017); Netto Arena (2018–2026)
- Address: ul. Władysława Szafera 3/5/7
- Location: Szczecin, Poland
- Coordinates: 53.4576°N 14.4949°E
- Operator: Arena Szczecin Operator sp. z o.o.
- Capacity: 5,055 (all-seated); 7,055 (with standing)

Construction
- Built: 2011–2014
- Opened: 25 July 2014
- Cost: 190 million zł (€45 million)

Tenants
- Wilki Morskie Szczecin (men's basketball); Pogoń Szczecin (men's handball); KPS Chemik Police (volleyball)

Website
- eneaarena.pl

Enea Arena, also known as Arena Szczecin, is a multi-purpose indoor arena in the Zawadzkiego-Klonowica neighbourhood of Szczecin, Poland. Opened in 2014, it has 5,055 permanent seats and a capacity of up to 7,055 for concerts with standing places. It is home to Wilki Morskie Szczecin of the Polish Basketball League.

The venue regularly hosts a wide range of sporting events, including athletics, badminton, basketball, fencing, gymnastics, handball, martial arts, table tennis and tennis. It is also suitable for theatre performances and film screenings, as well as concerts, exhibitions and conferences.

== History ==
The arena was constructed between 2011 and 2014 and officially opened on 25 July 2014. The total cost of the project was 190 million zł (€45 million).

In 2015, Grupa Azoty acquired naming rights for the venue, which subsequently became known as Azoty Arena. It was renamed Netto Arena in 2018 following a sponsorship deal with Netto. In 2026, it became Enea Arena following a sponsorship deal with Enea SA.

=== Events ===
Among the events held at the arena were the Eska Music Awards from 2014 to 2017 and pool B of the 2017 Men's European Volleyball Championship. A record audience of 8,000 people was recorded during a performance of the musical Metro in March 2015, by which time the venue had attracted a total of 420,000 visitors across all events.

== Gallery ==
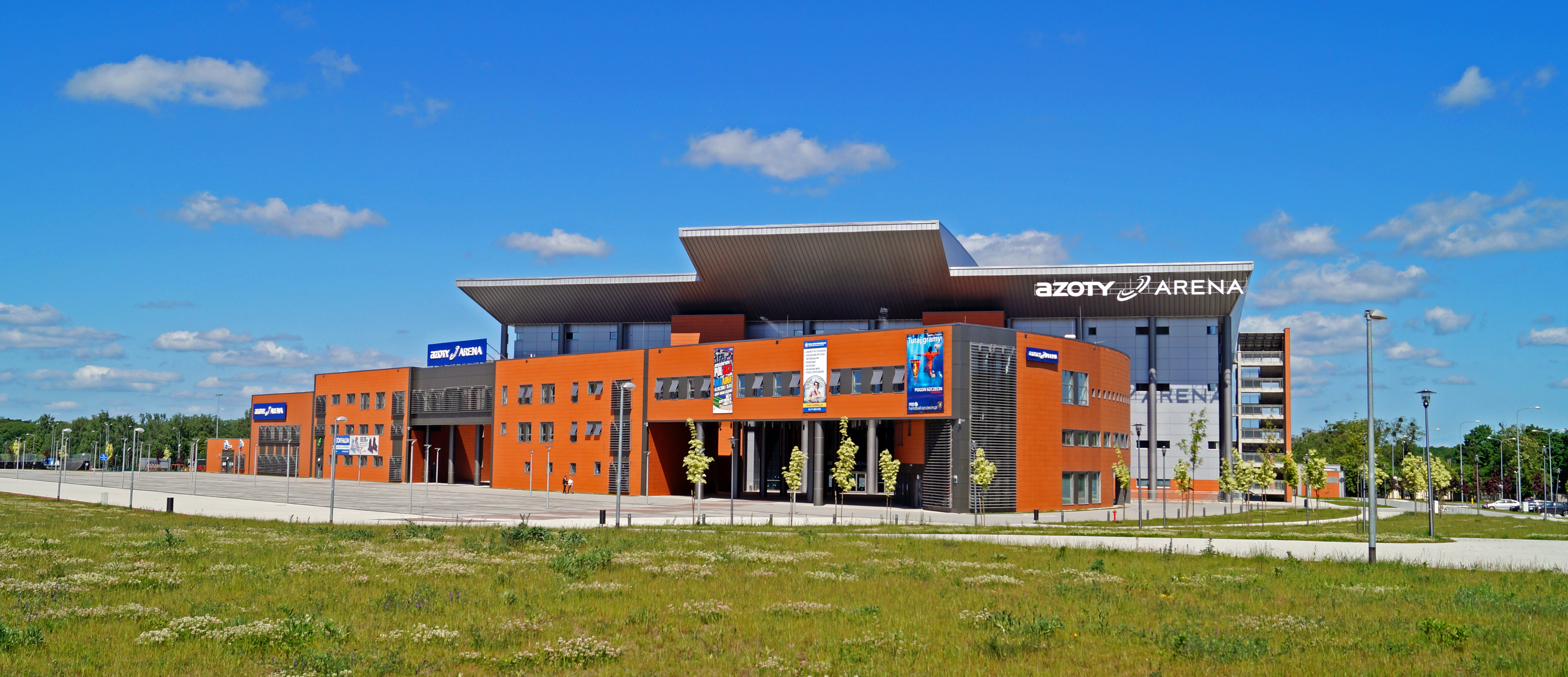
South view

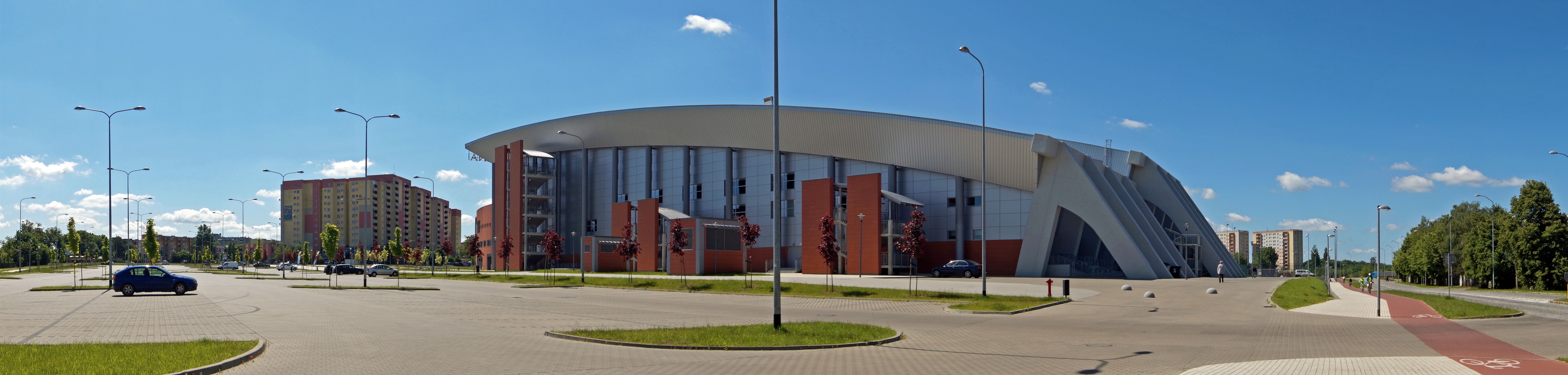
Northeast view

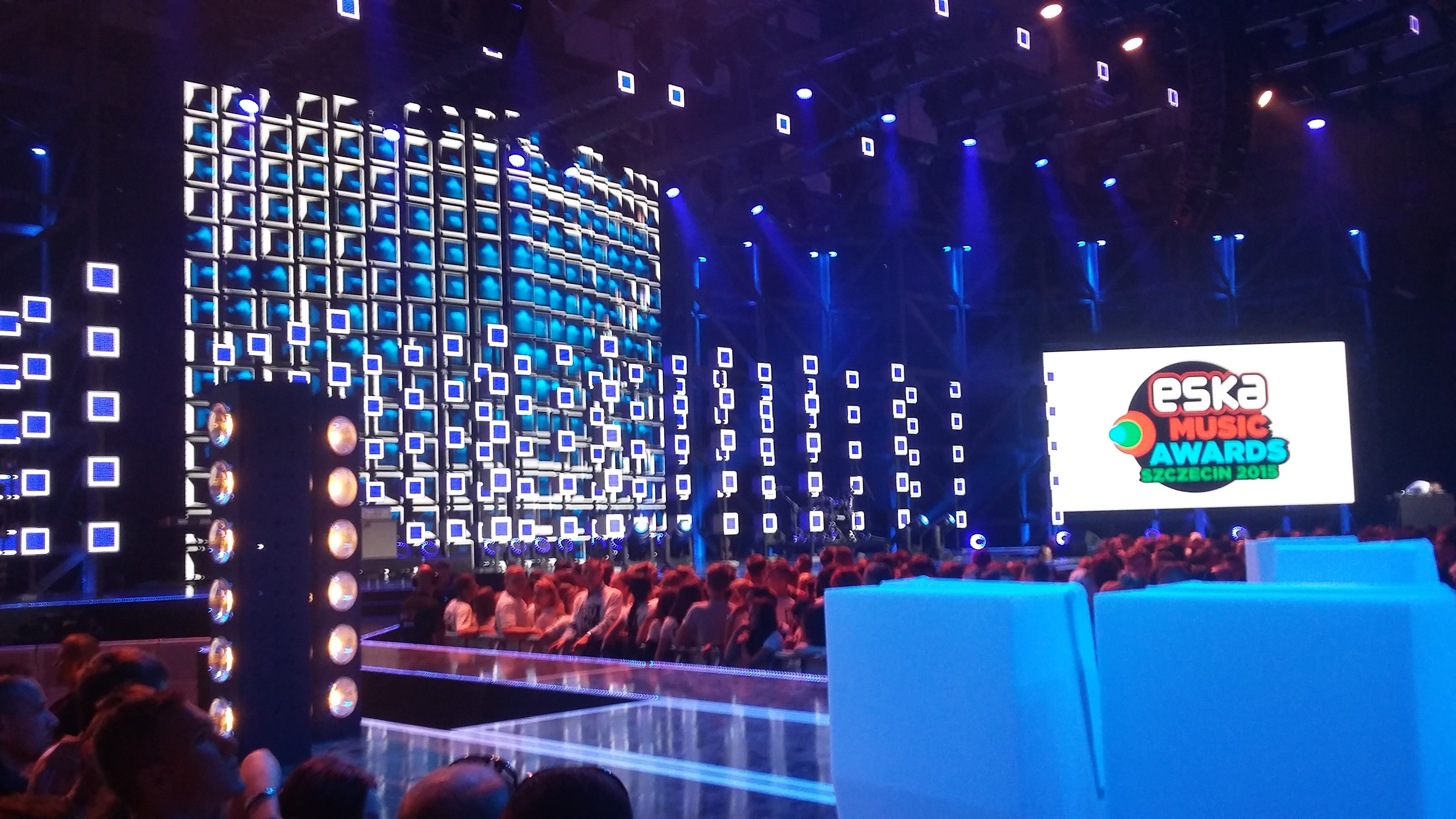
Interior during the Eska Music Awards 2015

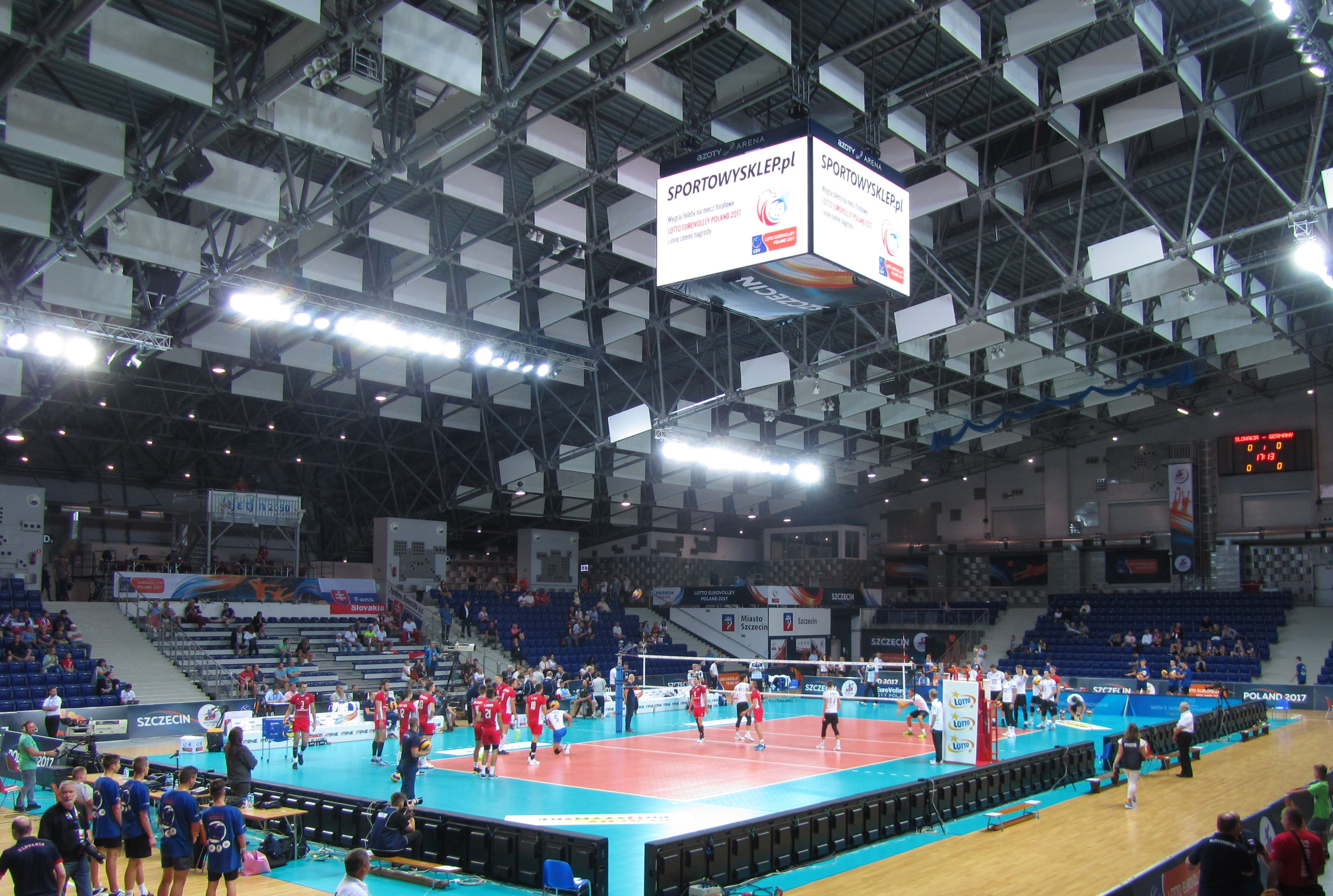
Interior during the 2017 Men's European Volleyball Championship

== See also ==
- List of indoor arenas in Poland
- Sport in Poland
