= Statue of Wojtek the Bear (Szczecin) =

Sculpture in Szczecin, Poland

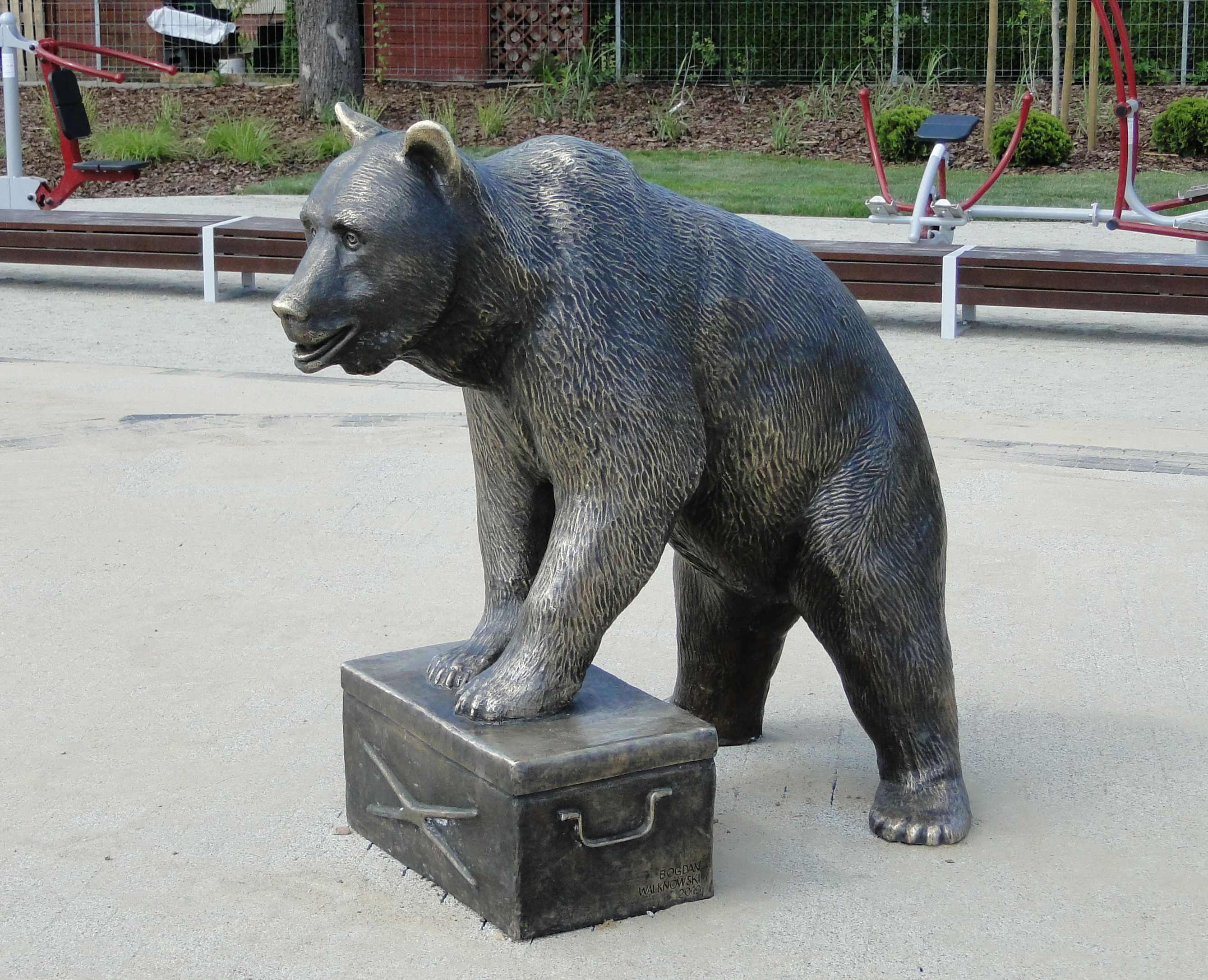
- The statue in 2019.
- Interactive map of Statue of Wojtek the Bear
- Location: Wojtek the Bear Square, Szczecin, Poland
- Coordinates: 53.449679°N 14.482209°E
- Designer: Bogdan Ronin-Walknowski
- Type: Statue
- Material: Bronze
- Completion date: 23 May 2019
- Opening date: 28 June 2019
- Dedicated to: Wojtek

The statue of Wojtek the Bear (Polish: Pomnik misia Wojtka) is a bronze sculpture in Szczecin, Poland, within the Krzekowo-Bezrzecze neighbourhood. It is placed at the Wojtek the Bear Square, at the corner of Misia Wojtka and Żyzna Streets. It is dedicated to Wojtek (1942–1963), a Syrian brown bear which accompanied the 2nd Polish Corps during World War II. The monument was designed by Bogdan Ronin-Walknowski, and unveiled on 23 May 2019.

== History ==
The statue was designed by Bogdan Ronin-Walknowski, and unveiled at the Wojtek the Bear Square on 23 May 2019. The square, which at the time remained under construction, was opened on 28 June 2019.

== Design ==
The bronze statue depicts Syrian brown bear Wojtek, standing with his front paws on a crate of ammunition. The sculpture was designed to allow children to sit on its back. It weighs 400 kg.
