= Statue of Wojtek the Bear (Sopot) =

Monument in Sopot, Poland

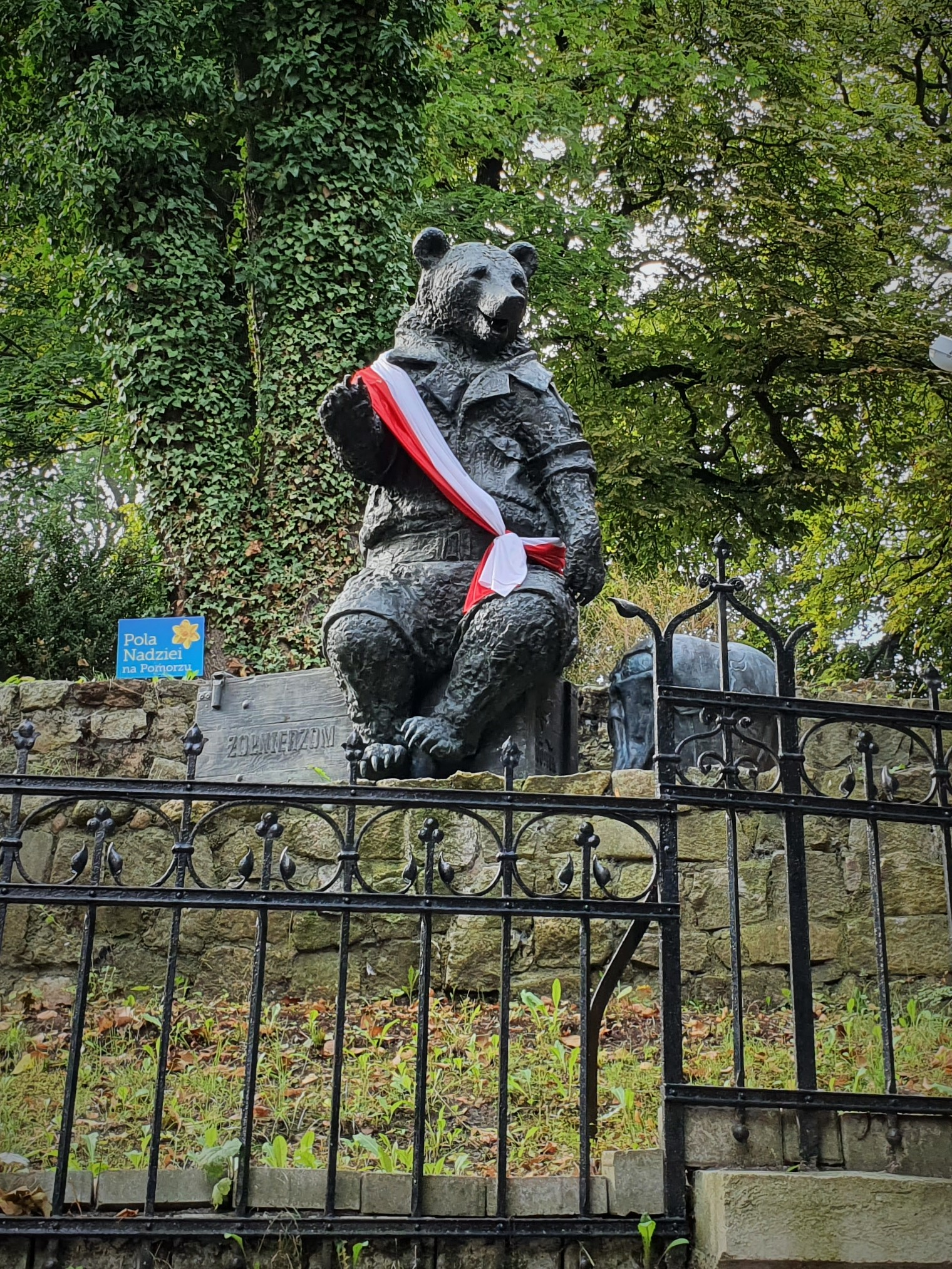
- The monument in 2022.
- Interactive map of Statue of Wojtek the Bear
- Location: Bohaterów Monte Cassino Street, Sopot, Poland
- Coordinates: 54.443355°N 18.564160°E
- Designer: Paweł Sasin
- Type: Statue
- Material: Bronze
- Opening date: 1 September 2019
- Dedicated to: Wojtek

The statue of Wojtek the Bear (Polish: Pomnik Misia Wojtka) is a bronze statue in Sopot, Poland, at Bohaterów Monte Cassino Street. It is dedicated to Wojtek (1942–1963), a Syrian brown bear which accompanied the 2nd Polish Corps during World War II. He is depicted wearing a military uniform and sitting on a crate of ammunition. The monument was designed by Paweł Sasin and unveiled on 1 September 2019.

== History ==
The monument was proposed by Ewa Rakowska-Eggar, a tourist guide based in London. She created two organizations to help collect the necessary funds, the Foundation for the Construction of the Wojtek the Bear Monument, based in Sopot, and Wojtek the Bear Friends Club, based in London.

The sculpture was designed by Paweł Sasin, and unveiled on 1 September 2019, on the 80th anniversary of the outbreak of the Second World War.

== Characteristics ==
The monument is placed on an escarpment behind the St. George Church and facing Bohaterów Monte Cassino Street (lit. Heroes of Monte Cassino Street). It is dedicated to Wojtek (1942–1963), a Syrian brown bear which accompanied the 2nd Polish Corps during World War II, including in the Battle of Monte Cassino, when he helped in moving crates of ammunition.

The bronze sculpture depicts a young Wojtek, wearing a summer military uniform of the 2nd Polish Corps, sitting on the crate of ammunition. On the side is a Polish inscription that reads żołnierzom (translation: to the soldiers). Next to him, to his right, is placed a backpack with a heart inside. It is a reference to a song Heart in the Backpack by Michał Zieliński, which was popular among soldiers of the Polish Armed Forces during the conflict. It also features a cartoon illustration of Wojtek holding an artillery shell.
