= Maritime University of Szczecin =

Public university in Szczecin, Poland

Coordinates: 53°25′43.01″N 14°33′48.83″E

- Politechnika Morska w Szczecinie
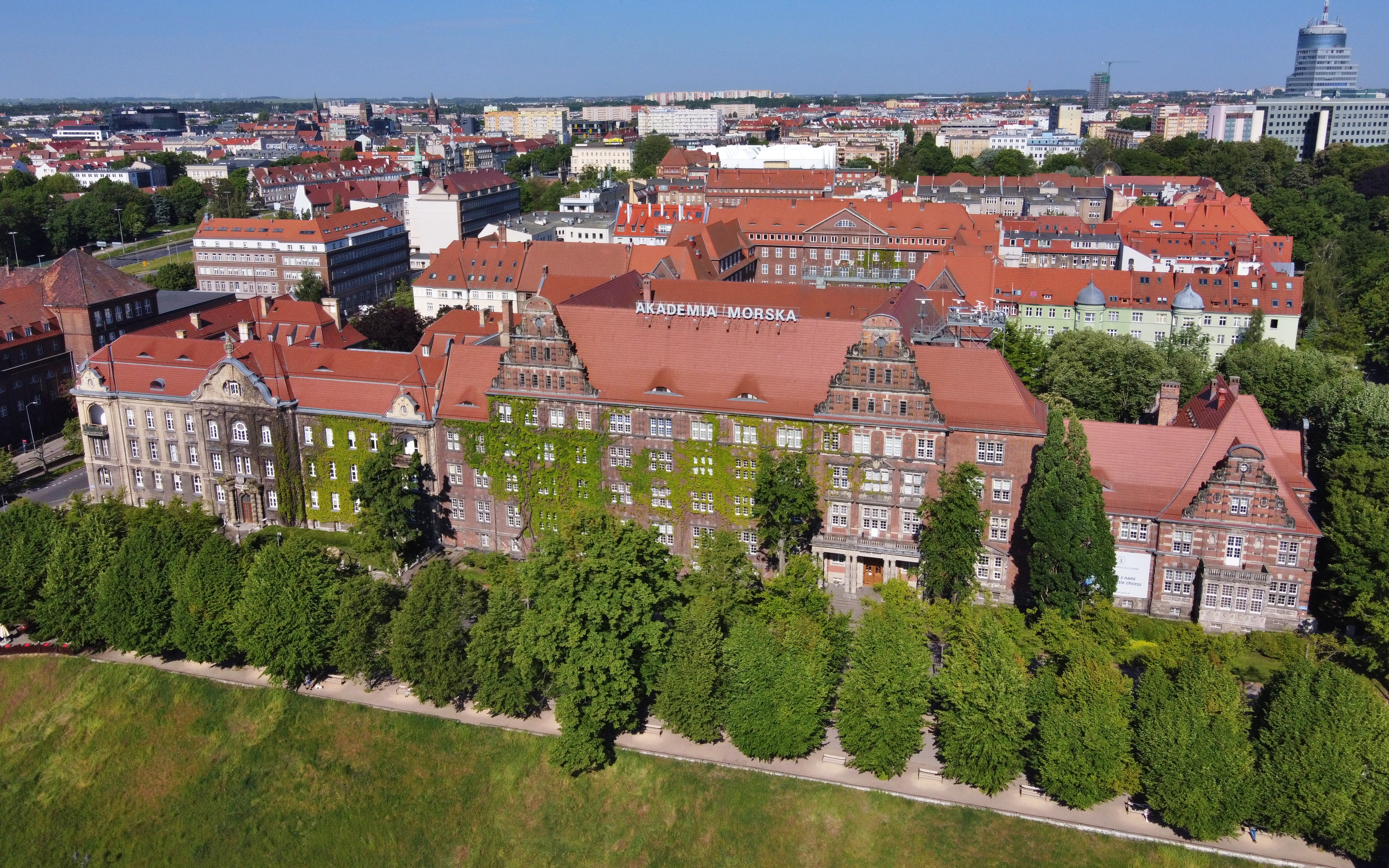
- Latin: Polytechnica Maritimae Stetinensis
- Motto: Navem agere ignarus navis timet
- Type: Public
- Established: 1947
- Rector: Wojciech Ślączka
- Students: 2,671 (12.2023)
- Location: Szczecin, Poland
- Website: www.pm.szczecin.pl

The Maritime University of Szczecin (Polish: Politechnika Morska w Szczecinie; Akademia Morska until 2022) is a public institute of technology in Szczecin, Poland. The profile of the institute of technology is maritime education. The Institute of Technology structure:

1. Faculty of Navigation
2. Faculty of Maritime Engineering
3. Faculty of Economics and Transport Engineering
4. Faculty of Mechatronics and Electrical Engineering
5. Faculty of Computer Science and Telecommunications

The structure of the University also includes:

1. Centre for Maritime Technology Transfer
2. International Students & Mobility Office.

The Maritime University of Szczecin and AGH University of Science and Technology have established educational cooperation in scope of maritime mining.

== Training programs ==
Sea-going programmes:

- navigation (in Polish and English language)
- mechanical engineering
- mechatronics

Other programmes

- transport
- naval architecture
- geodesy and cartography
- computer science
- logistics
- management and engineering of production
