= Szczecin Dąbie Airfield =

Coordinates: 53°23′28″N 14°38′01″E

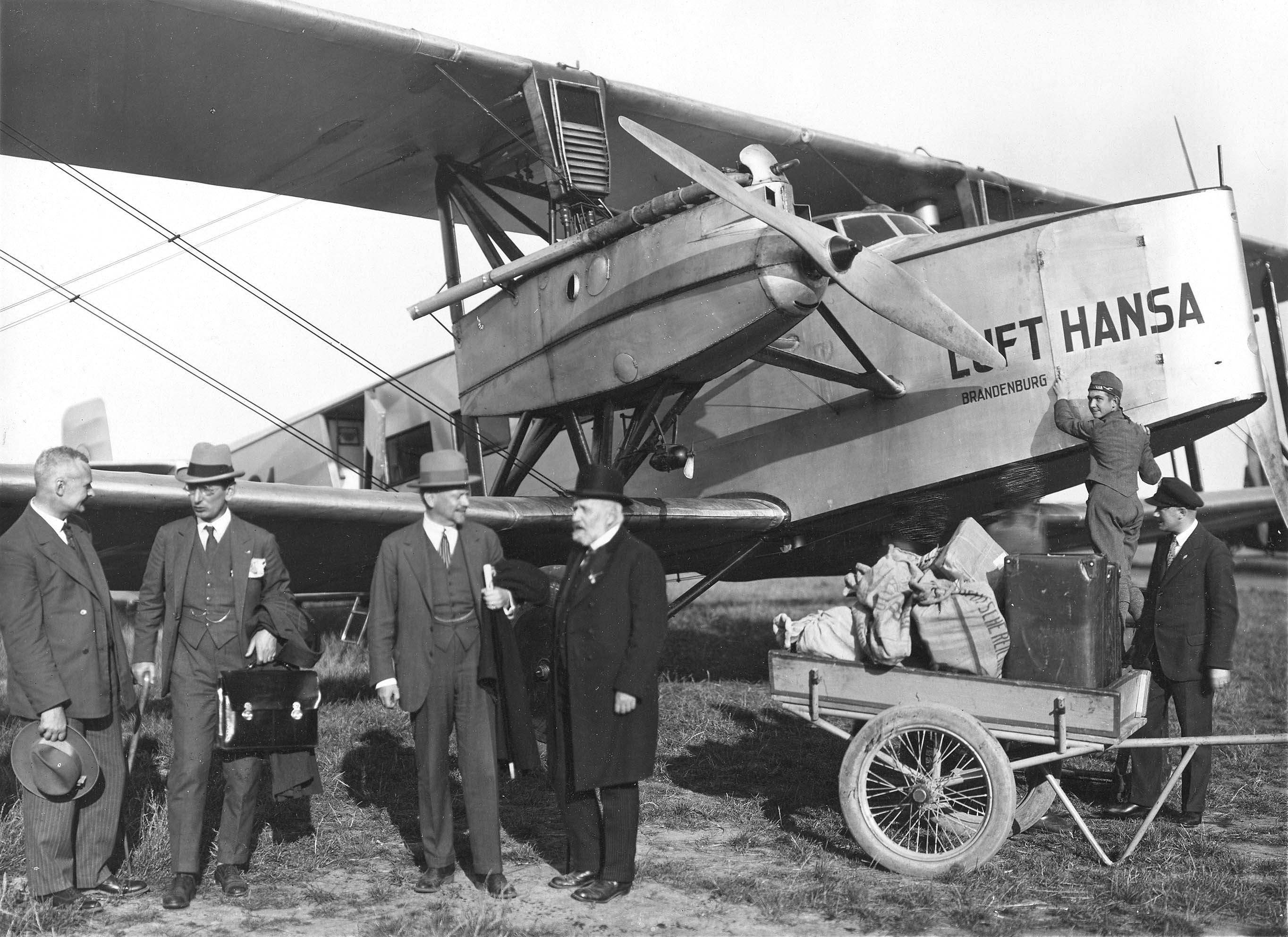
A Deutsche Luft Hansa Albatros L 73 at Stettin Airfield in 1927; second from left the Stockholm Municipal commissioner Yngve Larsson.

The Szczecin Dąbie Airfield (ICAO code: EPSD; Polish: Lotnisko Szczecin-Dąbie; German: Flugplatz Stettin-Dąbie), historically also known as Stettin Airfield (German: Flugplatz Stettin), and Dąbie Lake Airfield (German: Flughafen am Dammschen See), is a small airstrip on the Eastern bank of the Oder river in Dąbie, Szczecin, Poland. The original grass landing strip was built in 1921 and was used for domestic flights of Deutsche Luft Hansa over the following years. After World War II, LOT began serving the airfield, which remains the only one in Szczecin. From 23 May 1967, commercial operations were moved to a previously military use only airport near Goleniów (currently called Solidarity Szczecin–Goleniów Airport) located about 47 kilometres away from Szczecin.
