= Polish Armed Forces Avenue, Szczecin =

Avenue in Szczecin, Poland

Wojska Polskiego Avenue
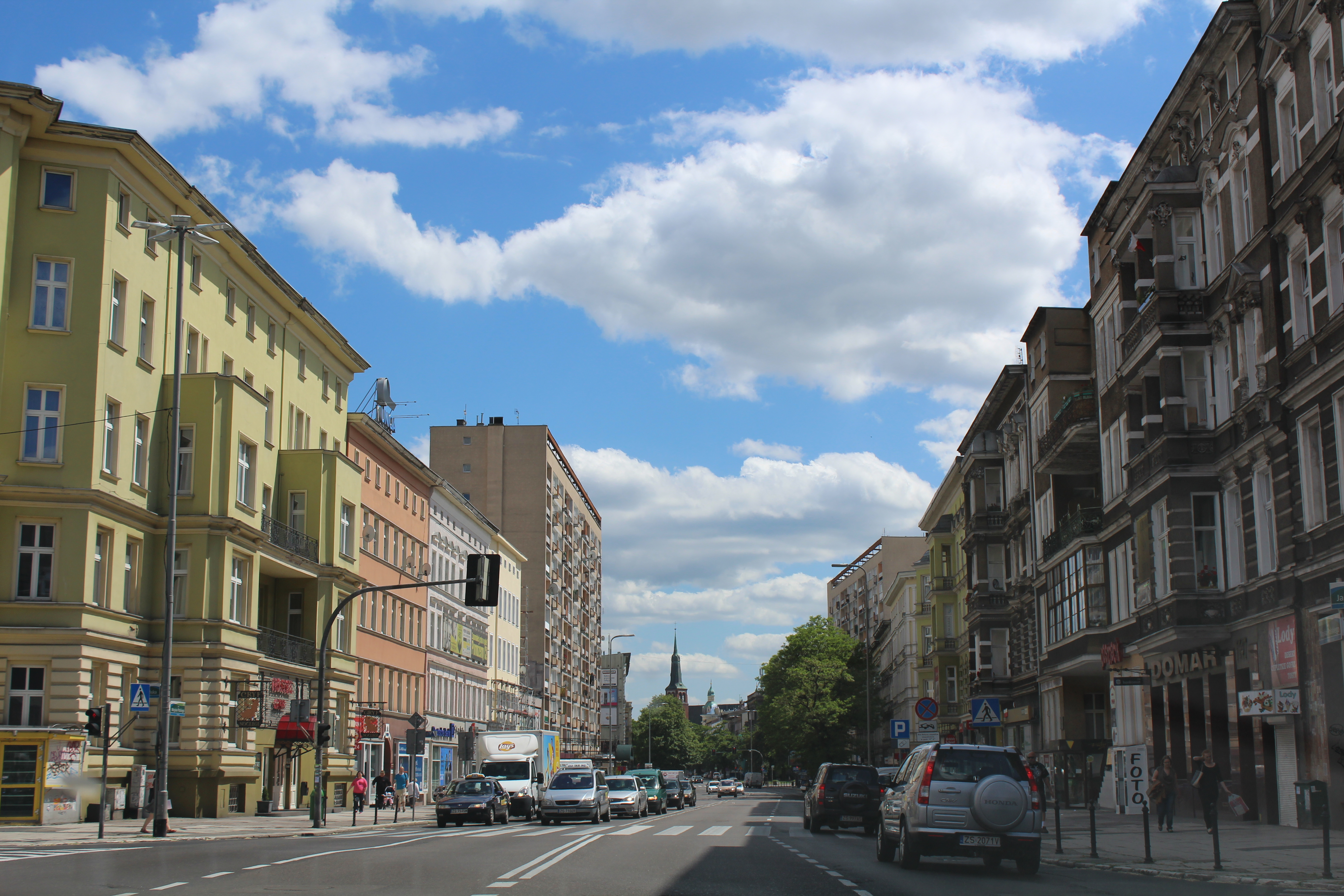
- Native name: Aleja Wojska Polskiego (Polish)
- Former name(s): Falkenwalder Straße
- Namesake: Polish Army
- Type: Avenue
- Maintained by: Szczecin Roads and Public Transport Authority
- Length: 6.9 km (4.3 mi)
- Addresses: 248
- Location: Szczecin, Poland
- Coordinates: 53.45025°N 14.515°E
- South-eastern end: Zwycięstwa Square
- Major junctions: Jagiellońska Street
- North-western end: Emila Zegadłowicza Street

Other
- Known for: second longest street of Szczecin
- Website: wojskapolskiego.szczecin.eu

The Wojska Polskiego Avenue (literally Army of Poland Avenue; German before 1945: Falkenwalder Straße) is one of the main streets of the Polish city of Szczecin (length 6.9 km), running from the south-east to the north-west. It lies on the territory of eight municipal neighbourhoods: Centrum, Śródmieście-Zachód, Śródmieście-Północ, Łękno, Pogodno, Arkońskie-Niemierzyn, Zawadzkiego-Klonowica, and Głębokie-Pilchowo. It constitutes a section of voivodeship road 115.

Some press articles, tourist brochures, websites and even the official website of Szczecin City Hall claim that Wojska Polskiego is the longest street in Szczecin. However, the longest street is Floriana Krygiera Street (formerly Autostrada Poznańska), which is approximately 8.5 kilometres long.

== History ==
=== Before 1945 ===
Today's Wojska Polskiego Avenue was originally a route leading from the Harbour Gate to the towns north-west of Szczecin. In 1858 a complex of Stoewer factory buildings was built at the intersection with Unii Lubelskiej Street. In 1870s by the section of the avenue between its intersection with Piotra Skargi Street and Szarych Szeregów Square villas of the Westend housing estate were erected. In 1879, at the junction with Piotra Skargi Street, a complex of buildings of a horse tram depot was built. From that depot the first horse trams left on 23 August 1879 on the route leading from Wojska Polskiego Avenue to Stanisława Staszica Street. In the 1890s the tram line was electrified, and the northern part of the avenue was partly developed with villas belonging to the Neu Westend housing estate. At the same time, plots on both sides of the avenue were developed from Szarych Szeregów Square to Zgody Square by erecting multi-storey tenement houses. Further construction investments along the avenue were carried out after the end of World War I, when blocks of flats were built north of Piotra Skargi Street. In 1938 the old tram depot at the junction with Piotra Skargi Street was closed and the new tram depot Straßenbahnhof West (today Pogodno depot) was opened.

=== 1945–1973 ===
As a result of the bombing of Szczecin during World War II, part of the buildings within the area of Zgody Square were destroyed. In 1959 on the plot at the intersection with Małkowskiego Street a building for the Kosmos Cinema was constructed according to the design of Andrzej Korzeniowski. In 1962 one of the corners with Jagiellońska Street was filled with a block of flats designed by J. Karwowski. In 1963 a competition was announced for developing the plots created after removing the ruins of destroyed tenement houses. The competition was decided in favour of Szczecin architects Wacław Furmańczyk and Witold Jarzynka, who designed four identical 10-storey blocks of flats. Two of them were built near the intersection with Edmunda Bałuki Street, the third near the intersection with Bohaterów Getta Warszawskiego Street, and the fourth in the frontage between Zgody Square and Jagiellońska Street.

=== 1973–2015 ===
On 1 December 1973, by decision of Mayor Jan Stopyra, tram traffic was withdrawn from the section of the avenue between Szarych Szeregów and Zwycięstwa Square. A year later, the section was modernised by renovating the pavements and roadways, installing traffic lights, planting trees and renovating the façades of buildings. At the junction with Piotra Ściegiennego and Królowej Jadwigi Streets a fountain in the form of a mosaic wall was erected, commonly referred to as the "Wailing Wall". From the early 1980s to 1994, the avenue was also repaired, along with the tram tracks, in the section from Szarych Szeregów Square to Bogumiły Street and further towards Głębokie Lake. In 1994, the depot at the junction with Piotra Skargi Street was cut off from the tram line.

In the 1990s, vacant plots between Zwycięstwa and Zgody Squares were filled with new houses. On 25 November 2001 the "Wailing Wall" was demolished and replaced by a fountain in the form of a pitcher pouring water, which after less than three years was devastated and finally dismantled.

=== After 2015 ===
In July and August 2015, the Szczecin Sociological Society (Polish Szczecińskie Towarzystwo Socjologiczne) and the Centre for Social and Economic Development (Polish Centrum Rozwoju Społeczno-Gospodarczego) held public consultations on the future appearance of the section of Wojska Polskiego Avenue between Szarych Szeregów Square and Zwycięstwa Square. In the public consultation, residents rejected the possibility of reconstructing the tram track or turning the avenue into a pedestrian zone. In January 2017, the city held a second public consultation in which members of the neighbourhood councils and residents were able to choose between four concepts for the reconstruction of the avenue:

- 1st concept: two carriageways with one traffic lane each, separated by parking spaces and greenery, 30 km/h speed limit zone;
- 2nd concept: two carriageways with two traffic lanes each, with the central lanes shared with the tramway track, limiting passenger car traffic, allowing access to the avenue only for taxis, resident cars and buses,
- 3rd concept: maintaining the current solution, i.e. two carriageways with two lanes each, limiting parking spaces by introducing greenery,
- 4rd concept: return to the pre-1973 traffic model, i.e. two carriageways with two traffic lanes each, tram tracks in the two central lanes, restriction of parking spaces by introducing greenery.

Eventually, 1st concept won. In response to the abandonment of the restoration of the tram line, the Association of the Aesthetic and Modern Szczecin (Polish Stowarzyszenie Estetycznego i Nowoczesnego Szczecina) demanded that the city re-run the public consultation. In May 2017, city activists started collecting signatures for a civic resolution project on the restoration of tram traffic on Wojska Polskiego Avenue. A vote in favour of restoring the tram line was cast by 1,554 people, after which the resolution was put to a vote at a city council session. Ultimately, with 9 votes in favour, 9 against and 2 abstentions, the resolution was not adopted.

In June 2017, the city, in cooperation with the Association of Polish Architects, announced a competition for the design of the reconstruction of Wojska Polskiego Avenue from Zwycięstwa Square to Szarych Szeregów Square. The winning project was prepared by the Archaid design studio. At the end of 2020, the city announced a tender for renovation of the said section of the avenue in accordance with the winning design. The tender was settled in March 2021 in favour of the MTM company. The selected contractor shall be obliged to carry out the modernisation works within 24 months from the date of entering into the agreement for the realisation of each of the two investment stages.

The new al. Wojska Polskiego will include 173 parking spaces, 6 EV charging stations and 9 disabled parking spaces. The speed will be limited to 30km/h.

== Notable objects ==
No.	Name	Image	Construction year	Heritage register	Description
	Sculpture "Labyrinth"	bezramki	1997	no	A fountain of clinker mouldings designed by Ryszard Wilk and built with funds from the Szczecin City Hall and the Pomeranian Credit Bank. Currently vandalised.
2	Kino Pionier 1907		1907	yes	One of the oldest continuously operating cinemas in the world.
8	"Kosmos" Cinema		1959	yes	The cinema building was erected in 1959. The cinema was closed in 2003.
63				no	The tenement house where Wilhelm Meyer-Schwartau lived from 1891 to 1935.
64	Villa of Heinrich Stolting		187x	yes	A villa built after 1870 for Heinrich Stolting. Nowadays it is the seat of Szczecin Artistic Agency.
65			1882	yes	Villa built in 1882.
66	Villa of Quodbach		1882	yes	A villa designed in 1876 by C.J. Decker for the entrepreneur Quodbach. Nowadays it is the seat of, among others, the Poland-East Cooperation Association.
70	Villa of August Horn		1871–1872	yes	The villa was built for August Horn, an entrepreneur. It is one of three wooden dwelling houses preserved in the Śródmieście district.
72	Villa of Simon		1910–1911	yes	The villa was built in 1910–1911 for a merchant named Simon. Nowadays it houses a medical clinic.
73				yes	The villa was the headquarters of the Polskie Radio Szczecin for many years.
76	Villa of Fritz Hoerder		1896–1897	yes	The villa was built in 1896–1897 according to a design by Nulin Widman for Fritz Hoerder, an entrepreneur. Today it is the seat of the Catholic High School.
84	Villa of August Lentz		1888–1889	yes	Built between 1888 and 1889 in eclectic style to a design by Max Drechsler for August Lentz, an entrepreneur.
92	Villa of Quistorps		1871–1872	yes	A villa built between 1871 and 1872 for Johannes Quistorp. Since 1950 it has been the seat of the Voivodship Ambulance Service.
97	Villa of Carl Gerloff		1871–1872	yes	The villa was built between 1871 and 1872 for the carpenter Carl Gerloff. Nowadays it houses a medical clinic.
115	Villa of Georg Grawitz		1897–1898	yes	The villa was built between 1897 and 1898 for the town councillor Georg Grawitz. It is the seat of the Tadeusz Szeligowski State Music School of the 1st Grade.
186	Car Mechanisms Factory "Polmo"		1899	no	The factory was established in Szczecin in 1946 on the premises of the former German factory Stoewer Werke AG. Today the office building is owned by the developer Modehpolmo.
200	Pogodno tram depot		1938	no	A tram depot located in the Zawadzkiego-Klonowica neighbourhood, Zachód city district. It was opened on 22 September 1938.
211	Villa of Otton Lindner		1925	yes	A villa built in 1925 for the merchant Otto Lindner. At present, it houses the Public Kindergarten No. 2.

== Public transport ==
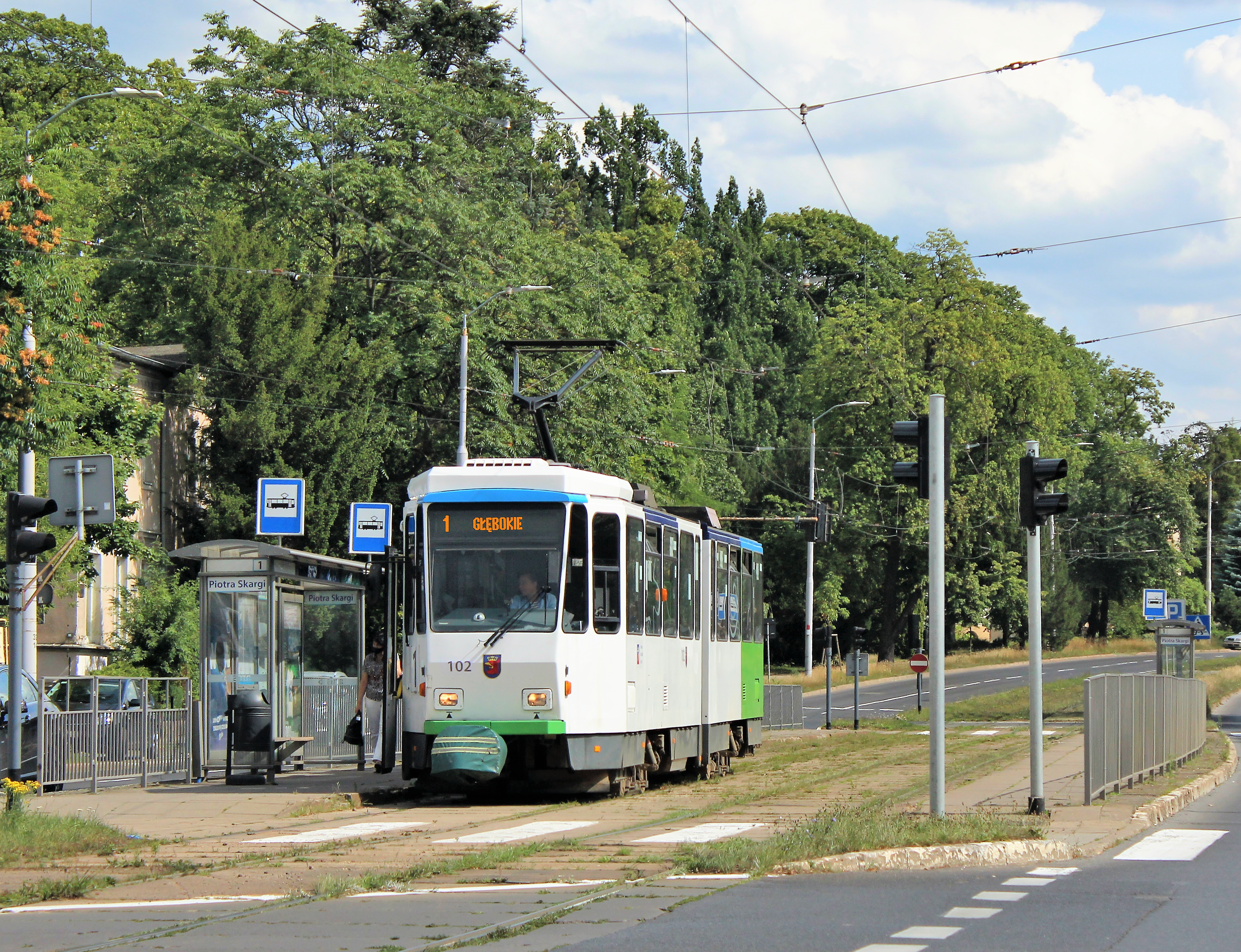
Tatra KT4DtM tram on line no. 1 near crossing with Piotra Skargi Street

=== Nowadays ===
As of 24 May 2021, the following public transport lines were running along Wojska Polskiego Avenue in the permanent traffic organisation:

- tram lines:
  - normal lines: 1, 9
- bus lines:
  - day lines: 53, 60, 87
  - night lines: 529, 531

=== In the past ===
- tram lines:
  - normal day lines: 5 (1905–1945, 1948–1973), 7 (1934–1945, 1945–1973), 10 (1967–1973), 12 (1985–1988)
  - night lines: 1N (1960–1996), 5N (1960–1973), 7N (1969–1973), 9N (1969–1996)

== Numbering ==
- Zawadzkiego-Klonowica: 184–202 even, 235 – 248
- Centrum: 1–63 odd
- Łękno: 105–121 odd, 122–142, 143–171 odd, 185
- Pogodno: 150–182 even, 189–231c odd
- Arkońskie-Niemierzyn: 187
- Śródmieście-Zachód: 2–62 odd
- Głębokie-Pilchowo: 245–254
- Śródmieście-Północ: 64–106
