= Niemierzyn =

Neighbourhood of Szczecin, Poland

- Neighbourhood
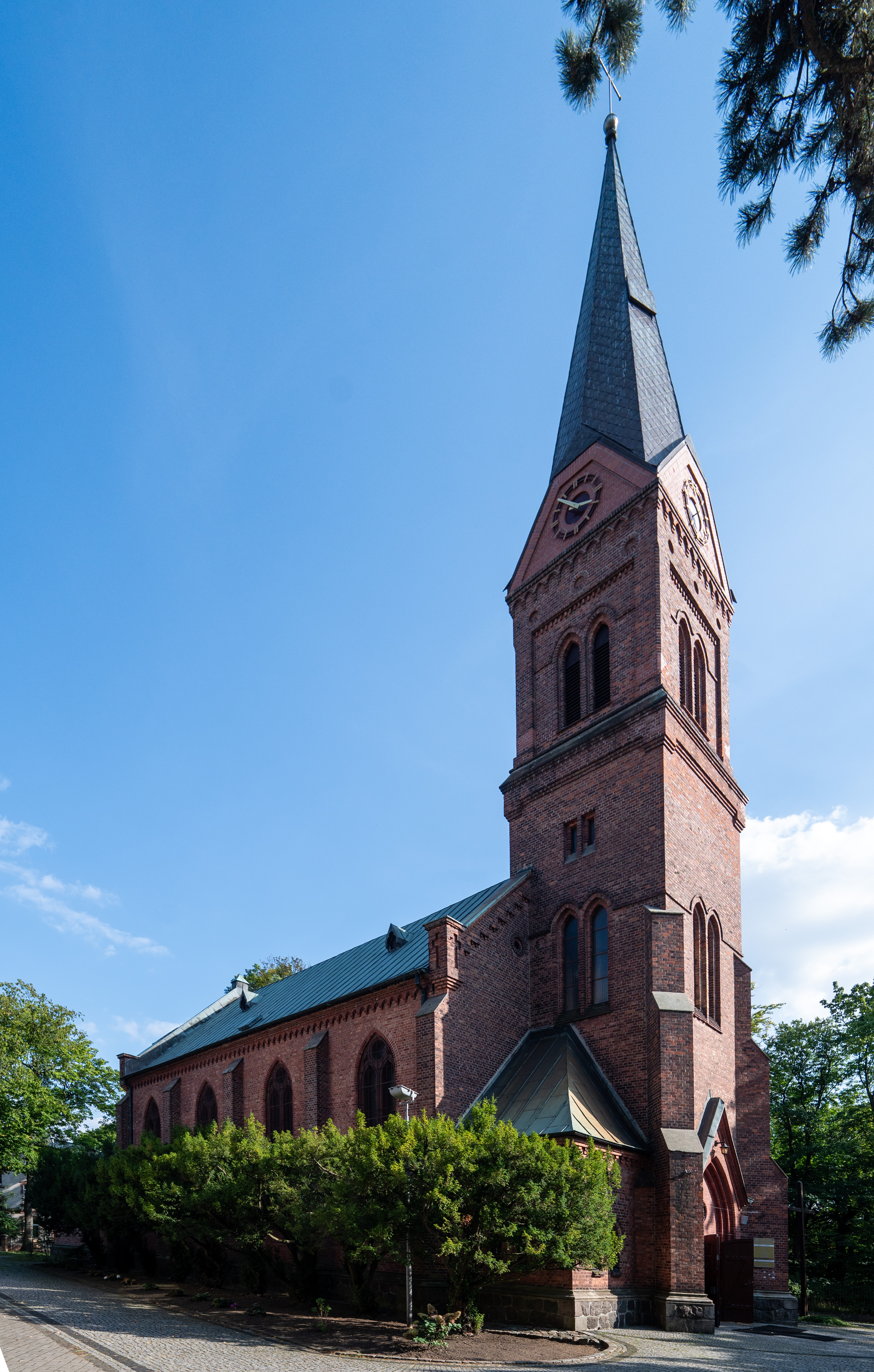
- The St. Casimir Church, a Baroque Revival temple in Niemierzyn dating to 1889.
- Interactive map of Niemierzyn
- Coordinates: 53.452563°N 14.535372°E
- Country: Poland
- Voivodeship: West Pomeranian
- City and county: Szczecin
- District: West
- Administrative neighbourhood: Arkońskie-Niemierzyn
- Time zone: UTC+1 (CET)
  - Summer (DST): UTC+2 (CEST)
- Area code: +48 91
- Car plates: ZS

Niemierzyn (Polish: [ɲɛ.mjɛˈʐɘ̟n]; German until 1945: Nemitz [ˈneː.mɪt͡s]) is a neighbourhood of Szczecin, Poland, located within the West district, in the administrative subdivision of Arkońskie-Niemierzyn. It is a residential area, predominantly consisting of low-rise single-family housing, including numerous villas dating to before the Second World War. It includes the St. Casimir Church, a Roman Catholic Baroque Revival parish church dating to 1889.

The area have been inhabited since the Bronze Age. In the 14th century, the village of Niemcza (German: Nemitz) was recorded in the area of thecurrent Arkońska Street, as a property of the Bishopric of Cammin. The settlement was burned down during the Thirty Years' War in the early 17th century, and was subsequently rebuilt. Until the 19th century, it was a farming community. From 1863 to 1940, Chick Mill Institute, a psychiatric and medical care facility for patients with mental disabilities and epilepsy, operated in the village. The area was incorporated into the city of Szczecin in 1900. Following the end Second World War, the city was placed under Polish administration, with the German population either fleeing or being expelled from the city and replaced by Polish settlers. The neighbourhood was renamed to Niemierzyn in 1945.

== Toponymy ==
The village in the area of the current neighbourhood was originally referred to by the Slavic population of the region as Niemcza and Niemica, later Germanised as Nemitz. The name came from the Slavic exonym for the Germans who inhabited the village, in contrast to Slavic people who resided in the surrounding settlements. Comparatively, the name for German people in Polish is Niemcy. The name Niemierzyn was given to the neighbourhood in 1945 by the mayor of Szczecin, Piotr Zaremba, replacing the previous German name Nemitz.

The neighbourhood is also the namesake of the Niemierzyn Valley, which covers most of the central western part of the city of Szczecin.

== History ==
The remains of five settlements from the Bronze Age (c. 2400–750 BCE) have been discovered alongside Warszewiec stream, within the modern boundaries of the neighbourhood of Arkońskie-Niemierzyn, including near the location of current Arkońska, Bartnicza, and Kochanowskiego Streets. Two settlements from the Lusatian culture (c. 1200–500 BCE) have also been discovered within the neighbourhood.

In the 14th century, the village of Niemcza (German: Nemitz), located near the current Arkońska Street, was property of the Bishopric of Cammin. In the 1340s, it was leased to judge Conrad Barfuss, together with the surrounding farming estate, fields, forest, and windmills. In 1335, the nearby city of Szczecin signed an agreement with Barnim III, the Duke of Pomerania-Stettin, in which the city ceded ownership of the smock mills in Niemcza to the duchy, with the stipulation that they would be returned to the city after the male line of the House of Griffin died out. In 1351, the city bought three smock mills in the village from the Bishopic of Cammin for the price of 1,520 pfennigs. At the end of the 17th century, the village was inhabited by five farmers and four crofters. The majority of its fields had sandy, infertile soil, but it included numerous meadows, which during dry years yielded about 50 lasts of hay. Some of the meadows served as pastures for horses and oxen. Village residents had the right to graze their cattle in the nearby forests, which measured 103 acres. The residents also grew cherry trees in their gardens, with their fruits being sold for large profits in the nearby city. The residents wove linen as an additional form of income. The farmers worked for the city three days a week on its agricultural fields in the summer and performed other assignments in the winter, including transporting wood. Each farmer had six horses and four oxen and employed a maid and an underaged servant. The village of Niemcza was burned down in the first half of the 17th century during the Thirty Years' War.

In 1756, Otto, a merchant from Szczecin, bought a portion of the village's fields, founding a hamlet with a manor house, later named Johannisthal.

In the first half of the 19th century, a Lutheran cemetery was opened on the current Niemierzyńska Street, serving the population of Niemcza. It included a chapel, which stood there until 1949. In 1868, the Niemierzyn Cemetery was opened to its south, becoming new burial place for the population of the village, while the older cemetery served the residents of Grabowo in the 1870s, being renamed to the Grabowo New Cemetery. The Niemierzyn Cemetery was also used by the upper class of Szczecin and was expanded in the 1930s. Following the end of the Second World War in 1945, the Grabowo New Cemetery remained largely unused, while the Niemierzyn Cemetery operated until the 1950s. The gravestones were removed from both cemeteries in the 1970s, without the exhumation of the bodies. The area was converted into parks, with the Jacek Karpiński Park in the north, and the Stefan Kownas Arboretum in the south. The latter, opened in 1975, is an arboretum with 82 recorded species of trees and bushes. Currently, both parks are located within the boundaries of the neighbourhood of Niebuszewo-Bolinko.

In the first half of the 19th century, a hydrotherapy centre was founded in the Arkona Woods to the north of Niemierzyn. It was later transformed into a bathing complex, and reopened as a hydrotherapy centre in 1860. It was demolished in 1890, and replaced with a new hydrotherapy hospital, predominantly for people with mental disorders. It also hosted cultural events such as concerts and dancing. After the end of the Second World War, it operated as a rehabilitation centre and resort for children. Since 1991, it houses the St. Brother Albert Youth Sociotherapy Center, a Roman Catholic all-boys boarding school orphanage, operated by the Caritas Internationalis. Currently, it is located within the boundaries of the neighbourhood of Osów.

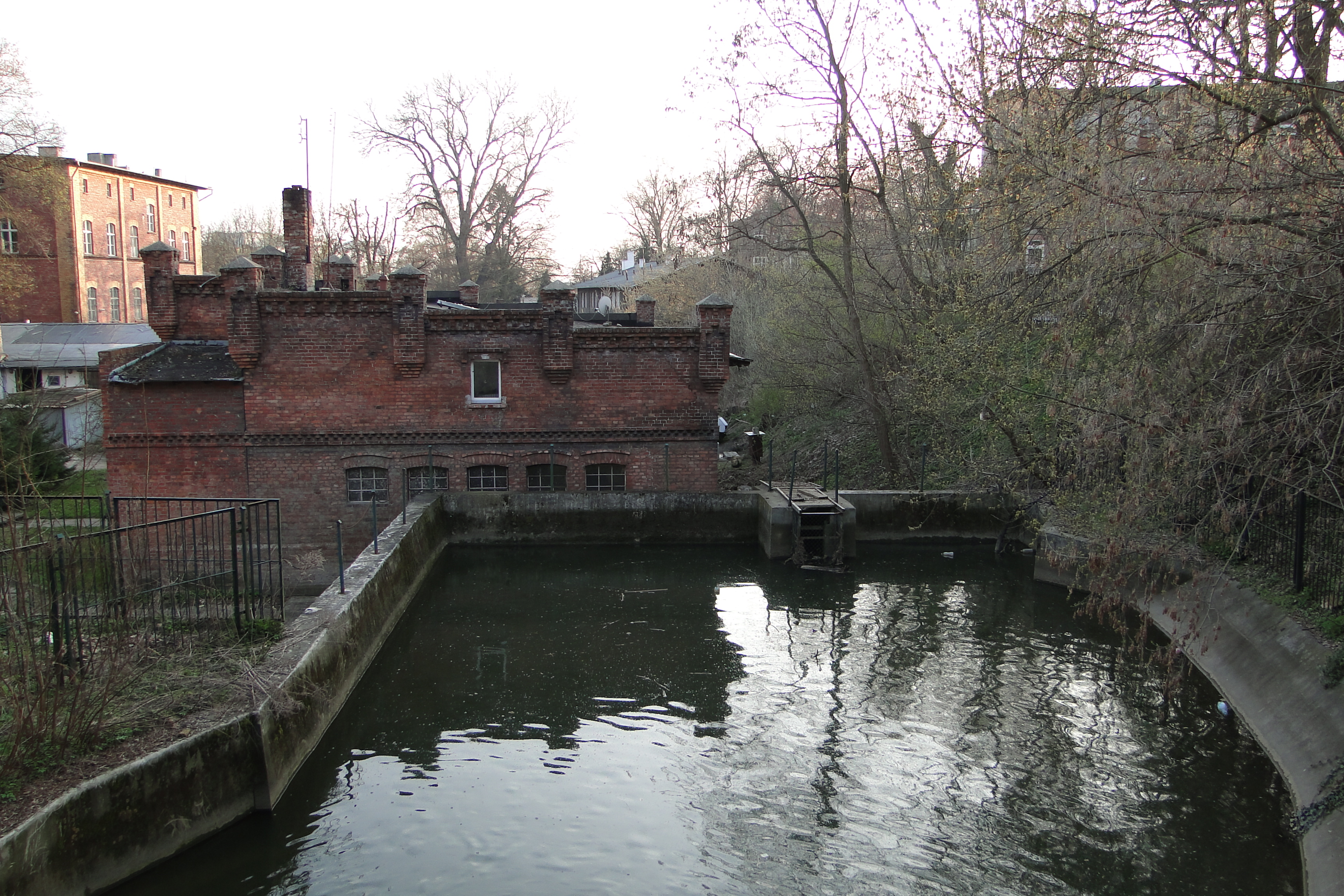
The Chick Mill, a watermill on Warszewiec stream, dating to at least the 16th century.

By 1864, the village's farmlands were split between landowners in Niemcza and Niebuszewo. The village was inhabited by 110 families, with a majority of the residents employed in Szczecin. Niemcza had four gristmills, one smock mill, and four watermills on the Warszewiec stream, including the Chick Mill, dating to the 16th century. Currently, the majority of the stream in the area flows via artificial underground canals. Niemcza had an area of 504 Magdeburg morgen (128.68 ha), including 256 morgen (65.36 ha) of farmland and 23 morgen (5.87 ha) of buildings. It also had nine gardens for food cultivation.

In 1862, Gustav Jahn, the director of a psychiatric hospital in the village of Żelechowa, bought the Chick Mill in Niemcza and around 3.6 ha of surrounding land to found a new facility to house mentally disabled children. It was opened the next year and operated by Lutheran nuns. The complex was expanded in the following decades with new buildings. In 1882, a nursing home for children with epilepsy was opened on the other side of the Warszewiec. In 1890, both facilities were combined, becoming known as the Chick Mill Institute. The facilities educated mentally disabled children, later also expanding its care and education to adult patients. By 1909, the complex had around 75 buildings, most of which did not survive to the present day. The complex also included two hospitals, divided for male and female patients. In 1938, the complex housed around 1,500 patients. It was closed down in 1940 on the orders of the Nazi Party, with patients being moved to other facilities and a portion of the buildings becoming barracks for the Armed Protection Squadron.

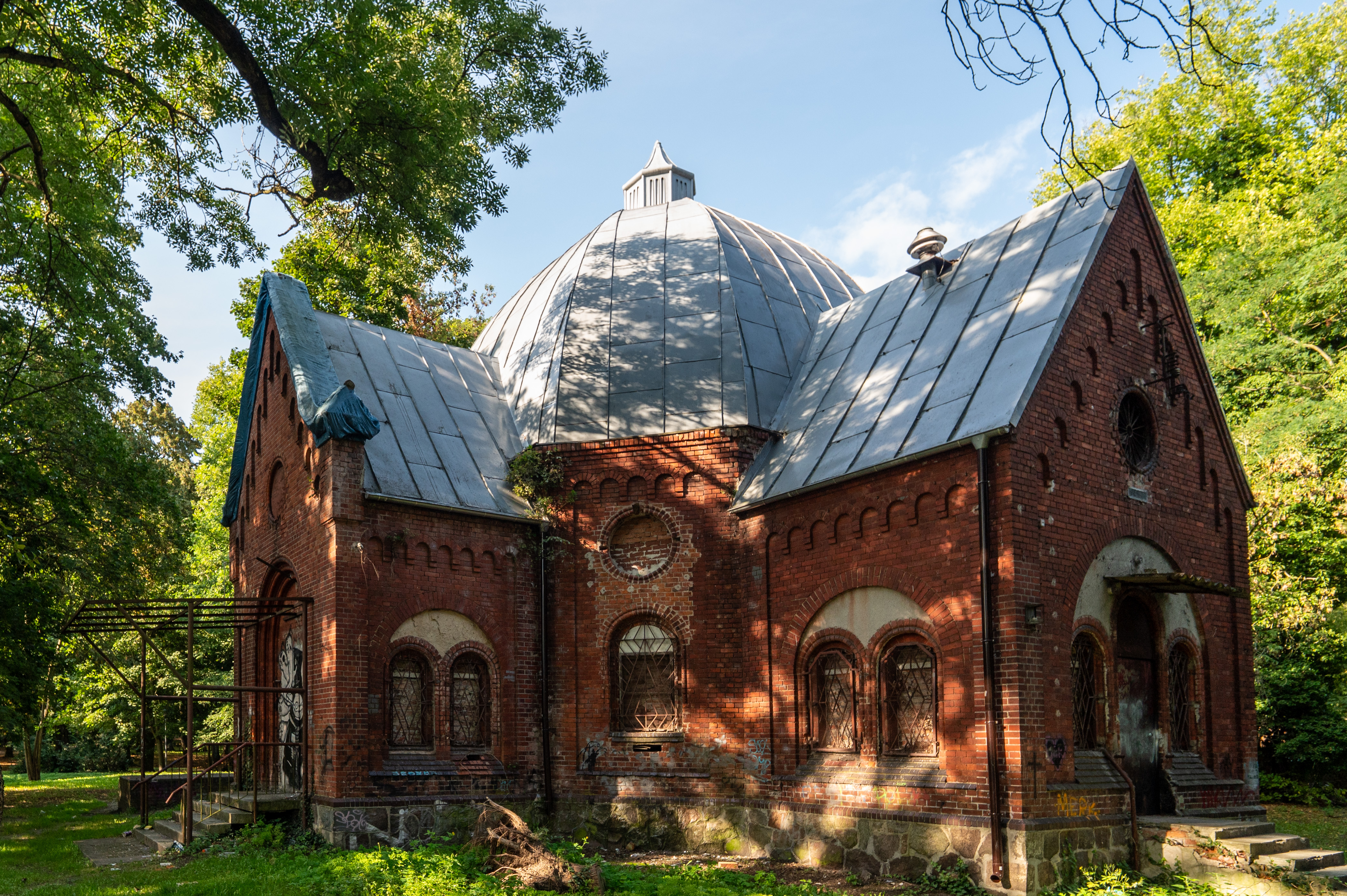
The Romanesque Revival chapel dating to 1900, built as part of the former cemetery on Chopina Street.

In 1871, a cemetery was opened alongside the current Chopina Street, serving the Chick Mill Institute and the nearby hospital. In 1900, there was built a Romanesque Revival chapel. The cemetery was later expanded in the 1930s, and last burials took place there in 1945. At the end of the 19th century, a small Lutheran cemetery was also founded on the current Tatrzańska Street, serving the residents of Niemcza. It was closed down in the 1930s. After the end of the Second World War, the chapel near Chopina Street was adopted into a mortuary of the Department of Forensic Medicine of the Pomeranian Medical University. It operated until 2001, with the chapel remaining abandoned since then. In the 1970s, the gravestones were removed from both of the cemeteries, without the exhumation of the bodies, with the area alongside Chopisa Street being redeveloped into the Frédéric Chopin Park, opened around 1980. A small portion of the gravestones is preserved and displayed in a lapidarium near the chapel.

Between 1888 and 1889, the St. Casimir Church was built at the current 18 Broniewskiego Street. It was founded as a Lutheran temple for the employees and patients of the Chick Mill Institute. The building was designed in the Gothic Revival, including a chancel and a bell tower, and accessibility features for the disabled patients. During the Second World War, the top of its tower was removed, with an anti-aircraft battery installed instead. After the war, the building was used as a temple by the Polish National Catholic Church, but was later abandoned as too few members lived in the area. In 1957, it was consecrated as a Roman Catholic church, as part of the parish of the Holiest Saviour, and was later granted the status of parish church in 1973.

The village was incorporated into the city of Szczecin in 1900.

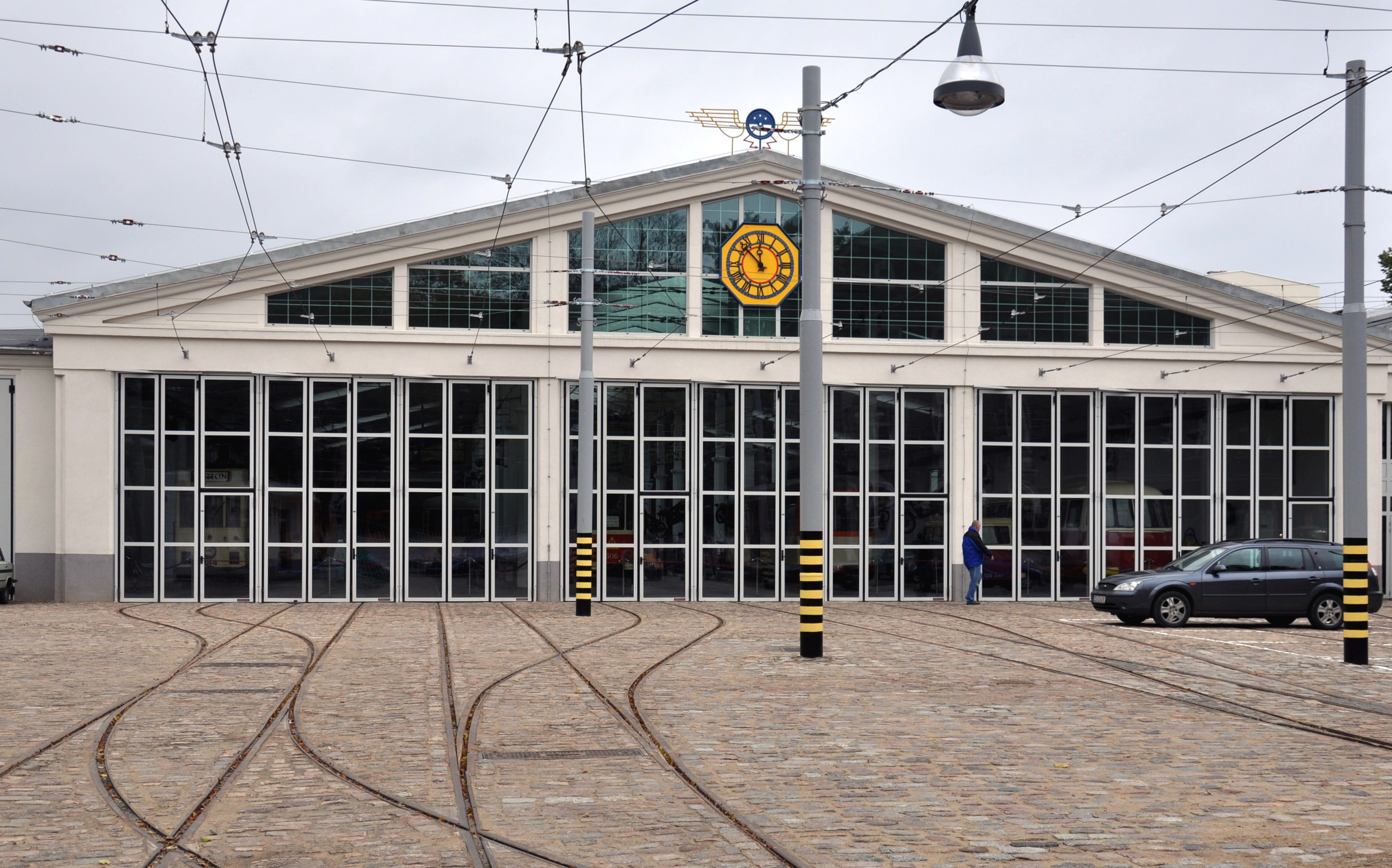
The Niemierzyn tram depot, built around 1913, currently housing the Museum of Technology and Transport.

Between 1897 and 1900, tram tracks were built alongside Niemierzyńska Street, connecting the neighbourhood with the rest of the city. In 1912, the line was extended alongside Arkońska Street. Around 1913, the Niemierzyn depot was opened near the neighbourhood at 18A Niemierzyńska Street. It operated until 2004. Since 2006, it houses the Museum of Technology and Transport. Currently, it is located within the boundaries of the neighbourhood of Niebuszewo-Bolinko.

During the Second World War, three labour camps operated in the neighbourhood for foreign forced labourers. Niemcza survived the conflict without destruction. Following the end of the conflict, the city of Szczecin was placed under Polish administration, with the German population either fleeing or being expelled from the city and replaced with Polish settlers. In 1945, the neighbourhood was renamed to Niemierzyn by the mayor of Szczecin, Piotr Zaremba.

In 1945, following the end of the war, the hospital buildings of the former Chicken Mill Institute on Arkońska Street were adopted to house a new fever hospital, named the Independent Public Voivodeship Polyclinical Hospital. In 1962, it began an expandsion with new wards, and in 2017, it was combined with the Alfred Sokołowski Specialist Hospital at 11 Sokołowskiego Street in the neighbourhood of Wielgowo-Sławociesze-Zdunowo.

From 1955 to 1976, the neighbourhood of Niemierzyn was one of the administrative subdivisions of the Pogodno district. In 1960, it had a population of 5,644 people. On 28 November 1990, the neighbourhood of Arkońskie-Niemierzyn was founded as one of the administrative subdivisions of the West district, being governed by an elected neighbourhood council. It incorporated the neighbourhood of Niemierzyn, together with the housing estates of Osiedle Arkońskie and Osiedle Tatrzańskie.

== Characteristics ==
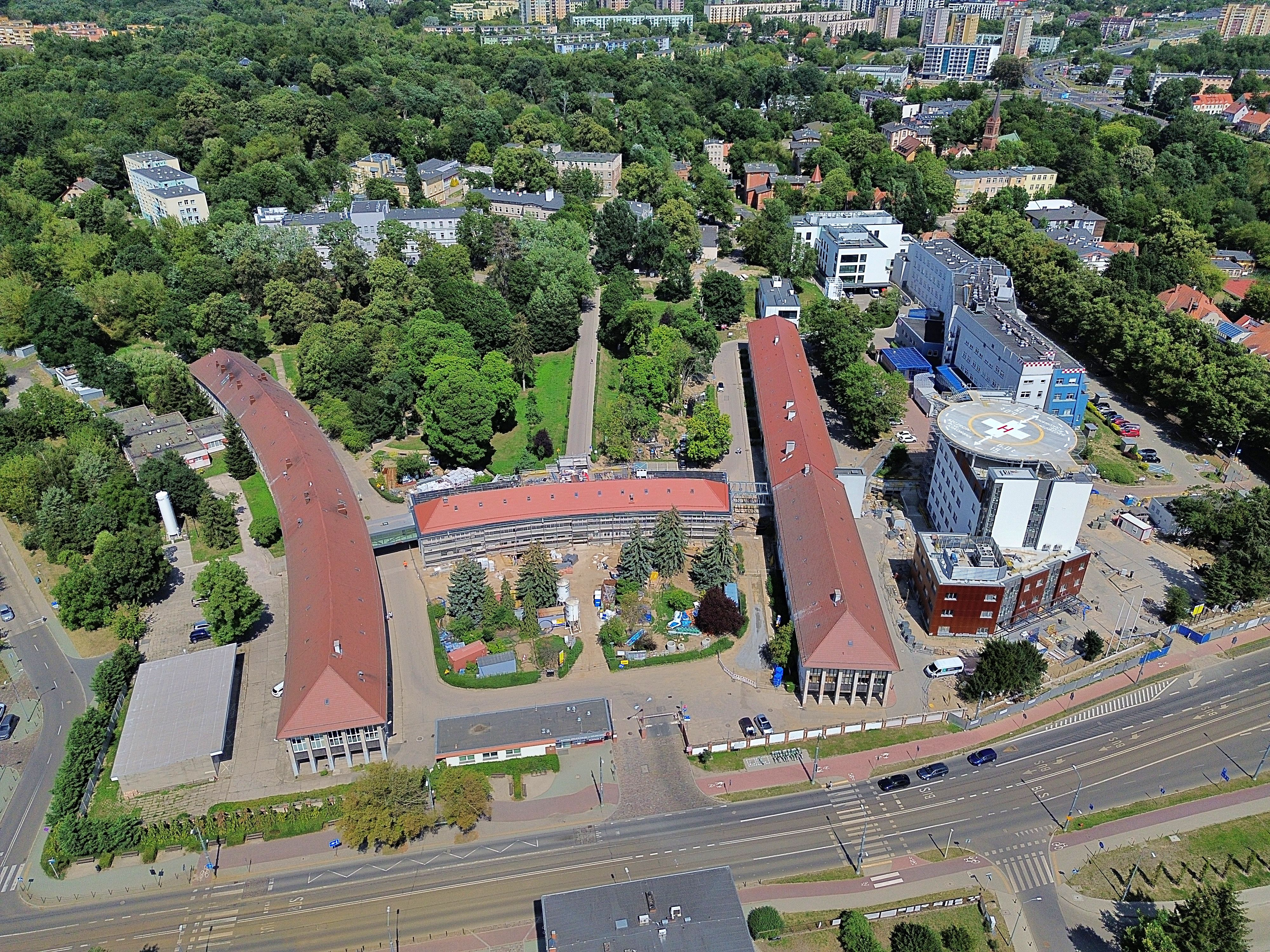
The Independent Public Voivodeship Polyclinical Hospital on Arkońska Street.

Niemierzyn is a residential neighbourhood, predominantly consisting of low-rise single-family housing, including numerous historical villas dating to before the Second World War. It also includes several apartments buildings. The neighbourhood features the St. Casimir Church, a Roman Catholic Baroque Revival parish church dating to 1889, located at 18 Broniewskiego Street. It also includes the Frédéric Chopin Park, a recreational area placed at the corner of Chopina and Wiosny Ludów Street, which features an abandoned Romanesque Revival chapel from 1900, and a lapidarium with gravestones preserved from the cemetery formerly located in the area, between 1871 and the 1970s. Niemierzyn also includes the Independent Public Voivodeship Polyclinical Hospital at 4 Arkońska Street.

Niemierzyn is crossed by the Warszewiec stream, most of which flows via artificial canals and underground pipes. It also includes the Chick Mill, a watermill which was present on the stream since at least the 16th century. In its vicinity, the area also features several historic buildings of the former Chick Mill Institute, a psychiatric and medical care facility for patients with mental disabilities and epilepsy, which operated from 1863 to 1940.

Niemierzyn is connected with the tram network, with thr tracks placed alongside Niemierzyńska and Arkońska Streets in its east. The neighbourhood is also the namesake of the Niemierzyn tram depot, located at 18A Niemierzyńska Street within Niebuszewo-Bolinko. Built around 1913, it was operated until 2004, and currently houses the Museum of Technology and Transport.
