= Arkońskie-Niemierzyn =

Neighbourhood of Szczecin, Poland

- Administrative neighbourhood
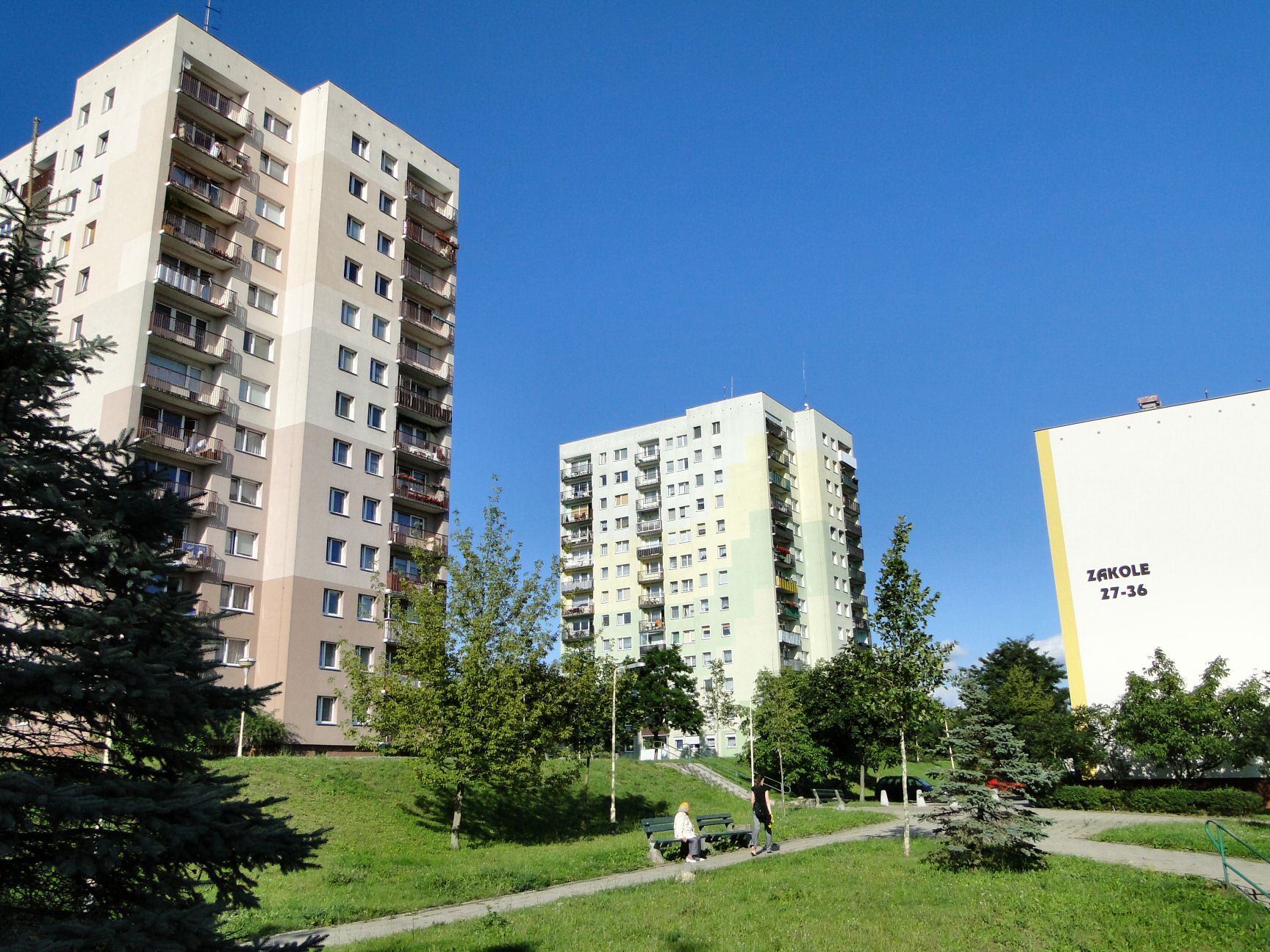
- The apartment buildings of Osiedle Arkońskie on Zakole Street.

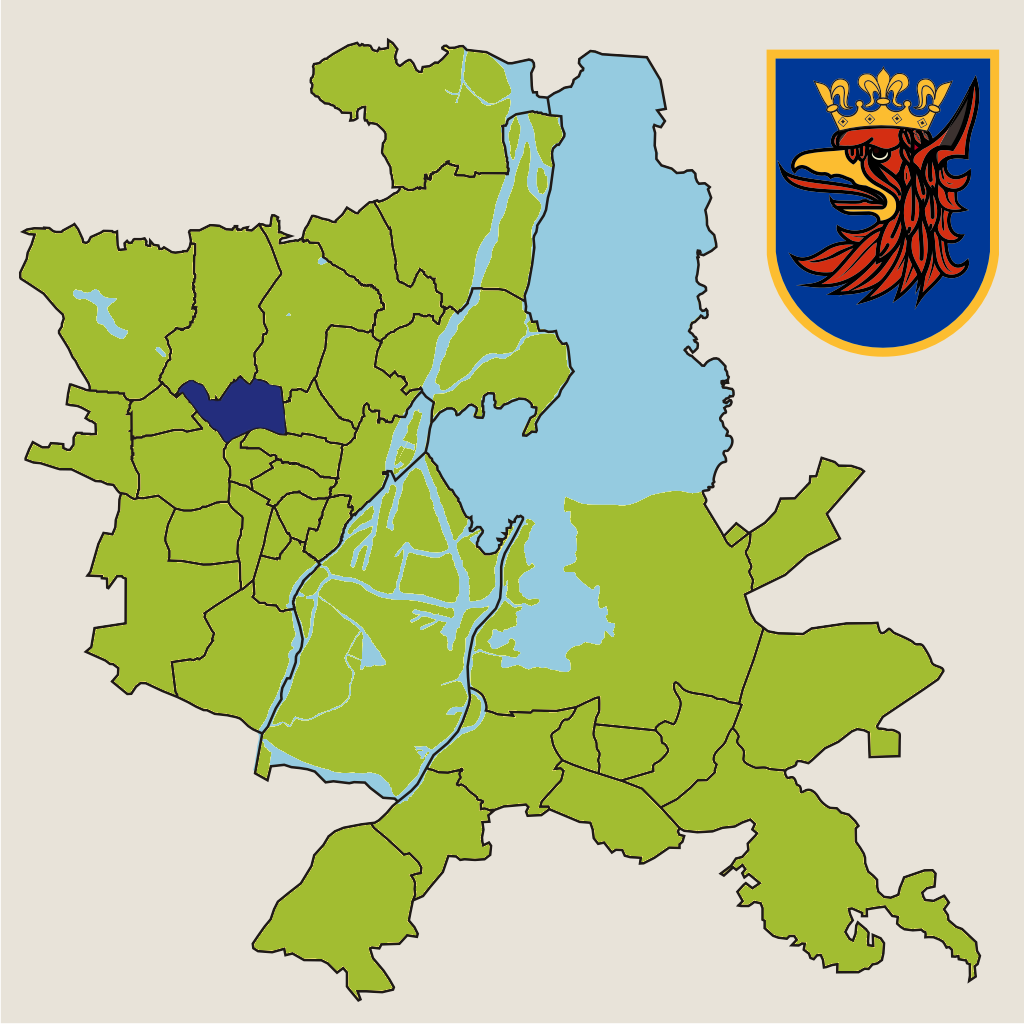
- The location of Arkońskie-Niemierzyn within Szczecin.
- Coordinates: 53.452563°N 14.535372°E
- Country: Poland
- Voivodeship: West Pomeranian
- City and county: Szczecin
- District: West
- Seat: 1 Judyma Street

Area
  - Total: 2.54 km^{2} (0.98 sq mi)

Population (2025)
  - Total: 10,591
- Time zone: UTC+1 (CET)
  - Summer (DST): UTC+2 (CEST)
- Area code: +48 91
- Car plates: ZS

Arkońskie-Niemierzyn (Polish: [ar.ˈkɔɲ.skjɛ ɲɛ.mjɛˈʐɘ̟n]) is an administrative neighbourhood forming a subdivision of the West district in the city of Szczecin, Poland. It is a residential area, predominantly consisting of low-rise single-family housing, contained in the neighbourhood of Niemierzyn. It also includes two housing estates, named Osiedle Arkońskie and Osiedle Tatrzańskie, which consists of apartment buildings. The area includes the St. Casimir Church, a Roman Catholic Baroque Revival parish church dating to 1889. It also features the Szczecin Botanical Garden, with alpine garden and greenhouses growing exotic plants. The neighbourhood has an area of 2.54 km^{2} (0.98 sq mi), and in 2025, was inhabited by 10,591 people.

The area have been inhabited since the Bronze Age. In the 14th century, the village of Niemcza (German: Nemitz), later renamed to Niemierzyn, was recorded in the area of the current Arkońska Street, as a property of the Bishopric of Cammin. The settlement was burned down during the Thirty Years' War in the early 17th century, and was subsequently rebuilt. Until the 19th century, it was a farming community. From 1863 to 1940, Chick Mill Institute, a psychiatric and medical care facility for patients with mental disabilities and epilepsy, operated in the village. The area was incorporated into the city of Szczecin in 1900. Between the 1920s and the 1950s, the Szczecin Botanical Garden was also developed to the west of Niemierzyn. Following the end Second World War, the city was placed under Polish administration, with the German population either fleeing or being expelled from the city and replaced by Polish settlers. In the 1970s, two housing estates, named Osiedle Arkońskie and Osiedle Tatrzańskie, were developed to the east and west of Niemierzym, respectively. The neighbourhood of Arkońskie-Niemierzyn was established in 1990.

== Toponomy ==
The name of Arkońskie-Niemierzyn combines the names of its primary neighbourhoods, Osiedle Arkońskie and Niemierzyn. The name of Niemierzyn was given to it in 1945 by the mayor of Szczecin, Piotr Zaremba. Previously, it was named in German as Nemitz. It was Germanised version of the names Niemcza and Niemica, which were given to the village located within modern neighbourhood in the Early Middle Ages. The name came from the Slavic exonym for the Germans who inhabited the village, in contrast to Slavic people who resided in the surrounding settlements. Comparatively, the name for German people in Polish is Niemcy. Osiedle Arkońskie is named after the Arkona Woods located to its northeast. It in turn was named after 1945 after the Cape Arkona on the island of Rügen in Mecklenburg-Vorpommern, Germany, which featured an important settlement of the Polabian Slavs in the Early Middle Ages.

== History ==
The remains of five settlements from the Bronze Age (c. 2400–750 BCE) have been discovered allongside Warszewiec stream, within the modern boundaries of the neighbourhood of Arkońskie-Niemierzyn, including near the location of current Arkońska, Bartnicza, and Kochanowskiego Streets. Two settlements from the Lusatian culture (c. 1200–500 BCE) have also been discovered within the neighbourhood.

In the 14th century, the village of Niemcza (German: Nemitz), later renamed to Niemierzyn, and located near the current Arkońska Street, was property of the Bishopric of Cammin. In the 1340s, it was leased to judge Conrad Barfuss, together with the surrounding farming estate, fields, forest, and windmills. In 1335, the nearby city of Szczecin signed an agreement with Barnim III, the Duke of Pomerania-Stettin, in which the city ceded ownership of the smock mills in Niemcza to the duchy, with the stipulation that they would be returned to the city after the male line of the House of Griffin died out. In 1351, the city bought three smock mills in the village from the Bishopic of Cammin for the price of 1,520 pfennigs. At the end of the 17th century, the village was inhabited by five farmers and four crofters. The majority of its fields had sandy, infertile soil, but it included numerous meadows, which during dry years yielded about 50 lasts of hay. Some of the meadows served as pastures for horses and oxen. Village residents had the right to graze their cattle in the nearby forests, which measured 103 acres. The residents also grew cherry trees in their gardens, with their fruits being sold for large profits in the nearby city. The residents wove linen as an additional form of income. The farmers worked for the city three days a week on its agricultural fields in the summer and performed other assignments in the winter, including transporting wood. Each farmer had six horses and four oxen and employed a maid and an underaged servant. The village of Niemcza was burned down in the first half of the 17th century during the Thirty Years' War.

In 1756, Otto, a merchant from Szczecin, bought a portion of the village's fields, founding a hamlet with a manor house, later named Johannisthal.

In the first half of the 19th century, a Lutheran cemetery was opened on the current Niemierzyńska Street, serving the population of Niemcza. It included a chapel, which stood there until 1949. In 1868, the Niemierzyn Cemetery was opened to its south, becoming new burial place for the population of the village, while the older cemetery served the residents of Grabowo in the 1870s, being renamed to the Grabowo New Cemetery. The Niemierzyn Cemetery was also used by the upper class of Szczecin and was expanded in the 1930s. Following the end of the Second World War in 1945, the Grabowo New Cemetery remained largely unused, while the Niemierzyn Cemetery operated until the 1950s. The gravestones were removed from both cemeteries in the 1970s, without the exhumation of the bodies. The area was converted into parks, with the Jacek Karpiński Park in the north, and the Stefan Kownas Arboretum in the south. The latter, opened in 1975, is an arboretum with 82 recorded species of trees and bushes. Currently, both parks are located within the boundaries of the neighbourhood of Niebuszewo-Bolinko.

In the first half of the 19th century, a hydrotherapy centre was founded in the Arkona Woods to the north of Niemierzyn. It was later transformed into a bathing complex, and reopened as a hydrotherapy centre in 1860. It was demolished in 1890, and replaced with a new hydrotherapy hospital, predominantly for people with mental disorders. It also hosted cultural events such as concerts and dancing. After the end of the Second World War, it operated as a rehabilitation centre and resort for children. Since 1991, it houses the St. Brother Albert Youth Sociotherapy Center, a Roman Catholic all-boys boarding school orphanage, operated by the Caritas Internationalis. Currently, it is located within the boundaries of the neighbourhood of Osów.

In the 19th century, the hamlet of Stoki (Rollberg) was founded to the north of Niemcza, as the property of the hamlet of Bukowo to farm sugar beets. A clay quarry and six brickworks were also founded in Stoki.

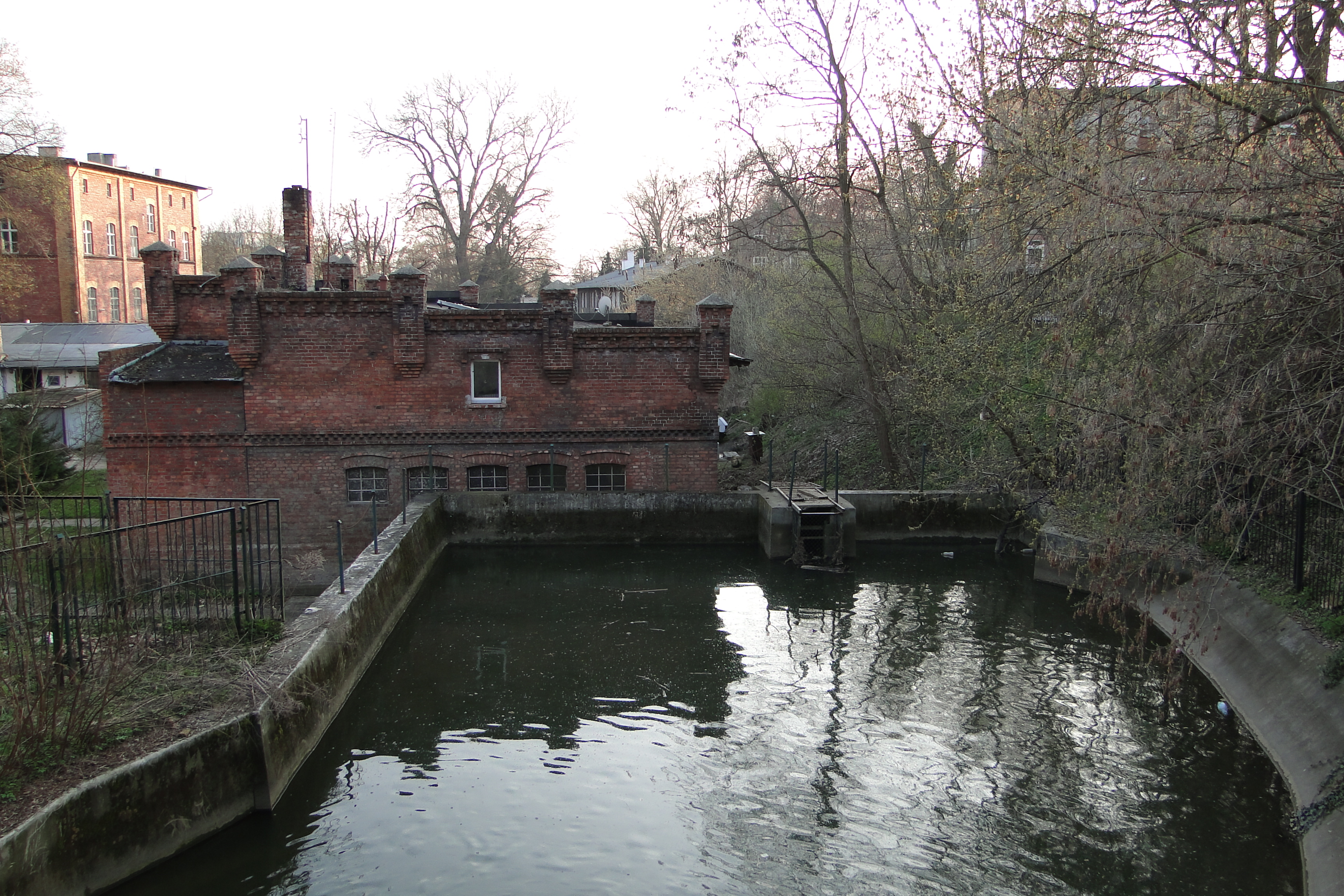
The Chick Mill, a watermill on Warszewiec stream, dating to at least the 16th century.

By 1864, the village's farmlands were split between landowners in Niemcza and Niebuszewo. The village was inhabited by 110 families, with a majority of the residents employed in Szczecin. Niemcza had four gristmills, one smock mill, and four watermills on the Warszewiec stream, including the Chick Mill, dating to the 16th century. Currently, the majority of the stream in the area flows via artificial underground canals. Niemcza had an area of 504 Magdeburg morgen (128.68 ha), including 256 morgen (65.36 ha) of farmland and 23 morgen (5.87 ha) of buildings. It also had nine gardens for food cultivation.

In 1862, Gustav Jahn, the director of a psychiatric hospital in the village of Żelechowa, bought the Chick Mill in Niemcza and around 3.6 ha of surrounding land to found a new facility to house mentally disabled children. It was opened the next year and operated by Lutheran nuns. The complex was expanded in the following decades with new buildings. In 1882, a nursing home for children with epilepsy was opened on the other side of the Warszewiec. In 1890, both facilities were combined, becoming known as the Chick Mill Institute. The facilities educated mentally disabled children, later also expanding its care and education to adult patients. By 1909, the complex had around 75 buildings, most of which did not survive to the present day. The complex also included two hospitals, divided for male and female patients. In 1938, the complex housed around 1,500 patients. It was closed down in 1940 on the orders of the Nazi Party, with patients being moved to other facilities and a portion of the buildings becoming barracks for the Armed Protection Squadron.

In 1871, a cemetery was opened alongside the current Chopina Street, serving the Chick Mill Institute and the nearby hospital. In 1900, there was built a Romanesque Revival chapel. The cemetery was later expanded in the 1930s, and last burials took place there in 1945. At the end of the 19th century, a small Lutheran cemetery was also founded on the current Tatrzańska Street, serving the residents of Niemcza. It was closed down in the 1930s. After the end of the Second World War, the chapel near Chopina Street was adopted into a mortuary of the Department of Forensic Medicine of the Pomeranian Medical University. It operated until 2001, with the chapel remaining abandoned since then. In the 1970s, the gravestones were removed from both of the cemeteries, without the exhumation of the bodies, with the area alongside Chopisa Street being redeveloped into the Frédéric Chopin Park, opened around 1980. A small portion of the gravestones is preserved and displayed in a lapidarium near the chapel.

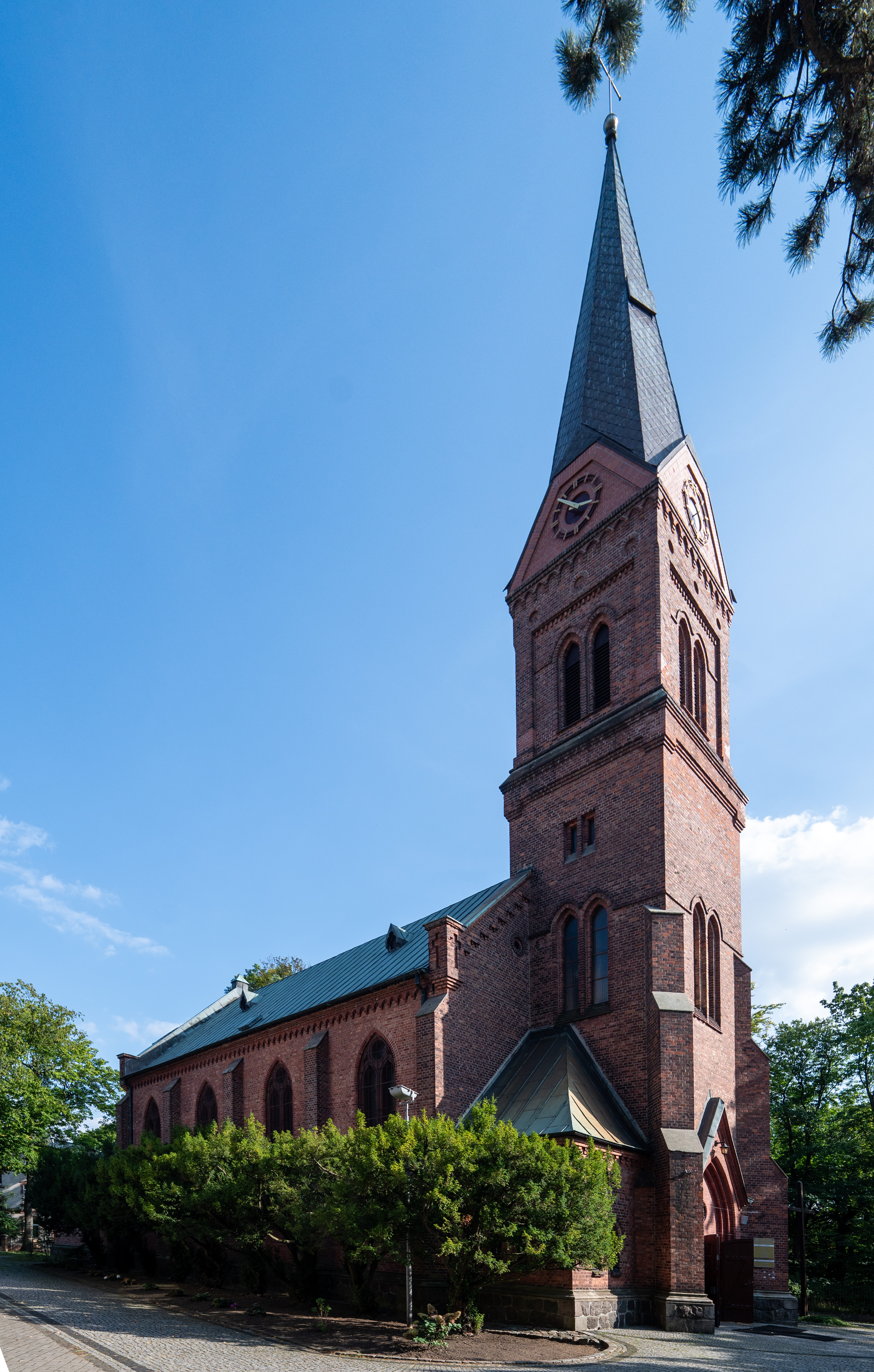
The St. Casimir Church, a Baroque Revival temple in Niemierzyn dating to 1889.

Between 1888 and 1889, the St. Casimir Church was built at the current 18 Broniewskiego Street. It was founded as a Lutheran temple for the employees and patients of the Chick Mill Institute. The building was designed in the Gothic Revival, including a chancel and a bell tower, and accessibility features for the disabled patients. During the Second World War, the top of its tower was removed, with an anti-aircraft battery installed instead. After the war, the building was used as a temple by the Polish National Catholic Church, but was later abandoned as too few members lived in the area. In 1957, it was consecrated as a Roman Catholic church, as part of the parish of the Holiest Saviour, and was later granted the status of parish church in 1973.

The village was incorporated into the city of Szczecin in 1900.

Between 1897 and 1900, tram tracks were built alongside Niemierzyńska Street, connecting the neighbourhood with the rest of the city. In 1912, the line was extended alongside Arkońska Street. Around 1913, the Niemierzyn depot was opened near the neighbourhood at 18A Niemierzyńska Street. It operated until 2004. Since 2006, it houses the Museum of Technology and Transport. Currently, it is located within the boundaries of the neighbourhood of Niebuszewo-Bolinko.

In 1923, the Richard Lindemann Sports Field was founded at the current 1 Arkońska Street, being placed within the Arkona Woods, to the northeast of Niemierzyn. It was the homefield of the association football club Stettiner SC. Its stands had a capacity for 32,000 spectators. In 1935, it hosted an exhibition game between the national teams of Estonia and Germany. In 1946, it became the home field of Arkonia Szczecin, being renamed to the Arkonia Szczecin Stadium. In 2018, the building was partially remodeled and modernised, with its capacity being reduced to 9,000 spectators, after a portion of the stands falling into disrepair.

Around 1926, the Szczecin Botanical Garden begun being developed to the east of Niemierzyn, with alpine garden and greenhouses growing exotic plants, being placed in an area between the current Arkońska Street and Polish Armed Forces Avenue. The works were halted by the outbreak of the Second World War, and it was eventually finished in the 1950s.

During the Second World War, three labour camps operated in the neighbourhood for foreign forced labourers. Niemcza survived the conflict without destruction. Following the end of the conflict in 1945, the city of Szczecin was placed under Polish administration, with the German population either fleeing or being expelled from the city and being replaced with Polish settlers. In 1945, the neighbourhood was renamed to Niemierzyn by the mayor of Szczecin, Piotr Zaremba.

In 1945, following the end of the war, the hospital buildings of the former Chicken Mill Institute on Arkońska Street were adopted to house a new fever hospital, named the Independent Public Voivodeship Polyclinical Hospital. In 1962, it began an expandsion with new wards, and in 2017, it was combined with the Alfred Sokołowski Specialist Hospital at 11 Sokołowskiego Street in the neighbourhood of Wielgowo-Sławociesze-Zdunowo.

From 1955 to 1976, the neighbourhood of Niemierzyn was one of the administrative subdivisions of the Pogodno district. In 1960, it had a population of 5,644 people.

In the 1970s, two housing estates were developed to the west and east of Niemierzyn, being designed by Tadeusz Łyżwa and Jacek Przybylski. They were Osiedle Tatrzańskie in the west, located between Wiosny Ludów, Arkońska, and Tatrzańska Streets, and Osiedle Arkońskie on the east, located between Wiosny Ludów, Chopina, and Wszyskich Świetych Streets, with the latter covering an area of 33 ha. Both of them consisted of mid- and high-rise apartment buildings, which were constructed using the large panel system technology. In the 1980s, a housing estate with several 5-storey apartment buildings was also developed on Wiosny Ludów Street, in the southern portion of the historic area of Stoki, in the area of Wiosny Ludów Street.

On 28 November 1990, the neighbourhood of Arkońskie-Niemierzyn was founded as one of the administrative subdivisions of the West district, being governed by an elected neighbourhood council. It incorporated the neighbourhood of Niemierzyn, together with the housing estates of Osiedle Arkońskie and Osiedle Tatrzańskie, as well as a souther portion of Stoki.

== Characteristics ==
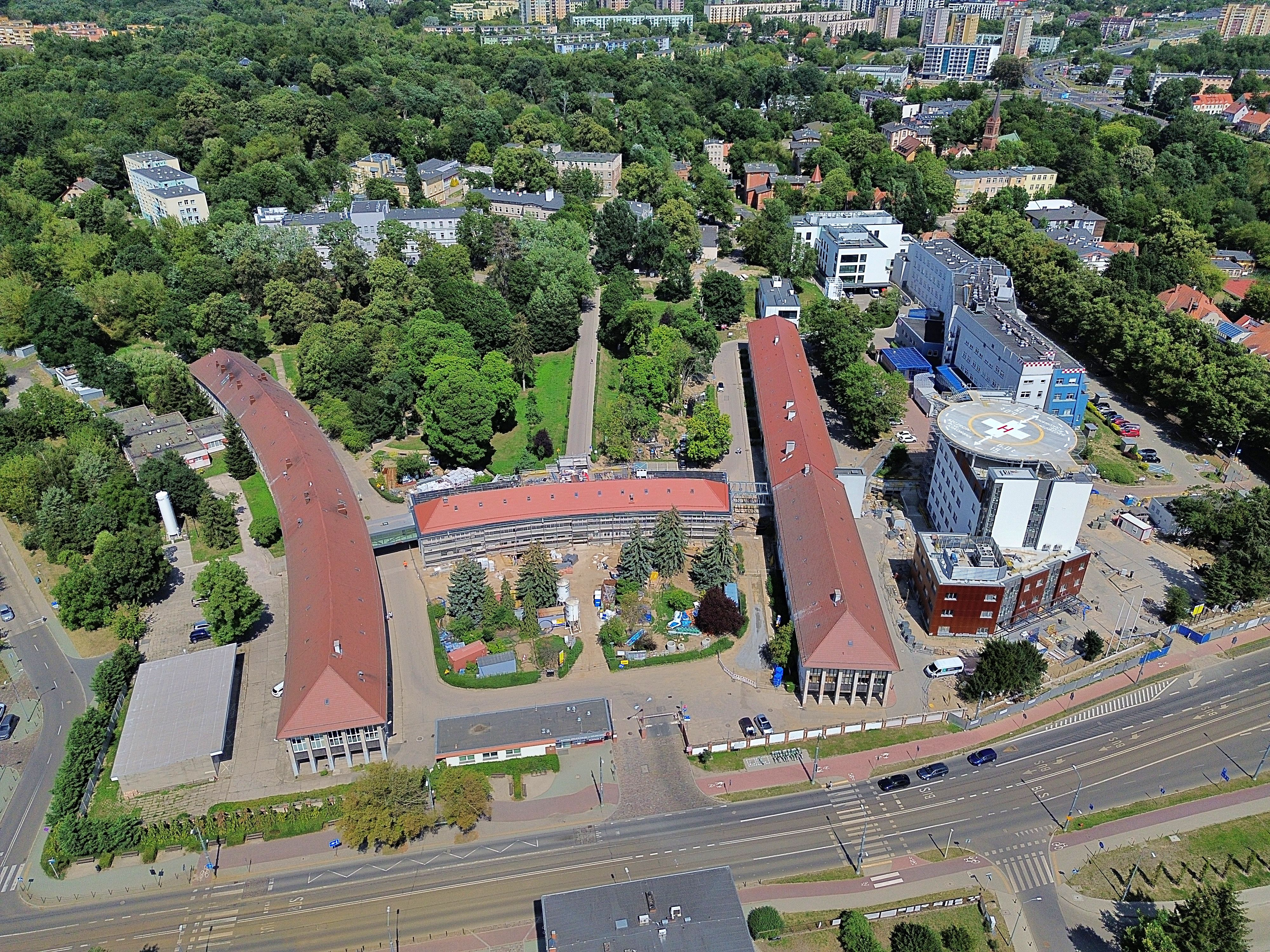
The Independent Public Voivodeship Polyclinical Hospital on Arkońska Street.

Arkońskie-Niemierzyn is a residencial area, predomiently dominated by low-rise single-family housing contained within the neighbourhood of Niemierzyn. It includes numerous historical villas dating to before the Second World War, and also features several apartments buildings. To its east and west, it borders two housing estates consisting of apartment buildings, developed in the 1970s using the large panel system technology. They are Osiedle Tatrzańskie in the west, located between Wiosny Ludów, Arkońska, and Tatrzańska Streets, and Osiedle Arkońskie on the east, located between Wiosny Ludów, Chopina, and Wszyskich Świetych Streets, with the latter covering an area of 33 ha, and housing around 6,000 people. It also includes a small housing estate of apartment buildings on Wiosny Ludów Street in the southern portion of the neighbourhood of Stoki. Arkońskie-Niemierzyn is connected with the tram network, with the tracks placed alongside Niemierzyńska and Arkońska Streets in its east. It also includes the Independent Public Voivodeship Polyclinical Hospital at 4 Arkońska Street.

The area features the St. Casimir Church, a Roman Catholic Baroque Revival parish church dating to 1889, located at 18 Broniewskiego Street. In its east, the neighbourhood features the Szczecin Botanical Garden, with alpine garden and greenhouses growing exotic plants, which is placed in an area between the current Arkońska Street and Polish Armed Forces Avenue. It also includes the Frédéric Chopin Park, a recreational area placed at the corner of Chopina and Wiosny Ludów Street, which features an abandoned Romanesque Revival chapel from 1900, and a lapidarium with gravestones preserved from the cemetery formerly located in the area, between 1871 and the 1970s. The neighbourhood also includes the Arkonia Szczecin Stadium with an association football field, placed at 1 Arkońska Street. It has capacity of 9,000 spectators, and is the home field of Arkonia Szczecin.

Niemierzyn is crossed by the Warszewiec stream, most of which flows via artificial canals and underground pipes. It also includes the Chick Mill, a watermill which was present on the stream since at least the 16th century. In its vicinity, the area also features several historic buildings of the former Chick Mill Institute, a psychiatric and medical care facility for patients with mental disabilities and epilepsy, which operated from 1863 to 1940.

== Demographics ==
Historical population
Year	2008	2009	2010	2011	2012	2013	2014	2015	2016	2017	2018	2019	2020	2021	2022	2023	2024	2025
Pop.	11,976	11,867	11,591	11,396	11,381	11,312	11,295	11,302	11,233	11,225	11,228	11,245	11,212	11,072	10,884	10,777	10,717	10,591
±%	—	−0.9%	−2.3%	−1.7%	−0.1%	−0.6%	−0.2%	+0.1%	−0.6%	−0.1%	+0.0%	+0.2%	−0.3%	−1.2%	−1.7%	−1.0%	−0.6%	−1.2%

== Government and boundaries ==
Arkońskie-Niemierzyn is one of the nine administrative neighbourhoods forming subdivisions of the West district in the city of Szczecin, Poland. It is governed by a locally elected neighbourhood council with 15 members, and a board of administrators with 5 members, the latter chosen internally. Its seat is located at 1 Judyma Street. The neighbourhood borders Osów and Warszewo to the north, Niebuszewo to the east, Łękno and Niebuszewo-Bolinko to the south, and Pogodno and Zawadzkiego-Klonowica to the west. Its boundaries are approximately determined by Arkońska Street, Arkona Forest Park, the border with the neighbourhood of Warszewo, Dunska Street, Krasińskiego Street, the tracks of the railway line no. 406, Polish Armed Forces Avenue, Kochanowskiego Street, Szczecin Botanical Garden, and Międzyparkowa Street. The neighbourhood borders Osów and Warszewo to the north, Niebuszewo to the east, Łękno and Niebuszewo-Bolinko to the south, and Pogodno and Zawadzkiego-Klonowica to the west. Arkońskie-Niemierzyn has the total area of 2.54 km^{2} (0.98 sq mi).
