= Bystry Rów =

Location
- Country: Poland
- Voivodeship: West Pomeranian
- City county: Szczecin

Physical characteristics
- Source
  - location: Warszewo
  - coordinates: 53°28′08.0″N 14°32′38.1″E
- Mouth
  - location: Niebuszewo
  - coordinates: 53°27′23.8″N 14°32′45.8″E
- Length: 1.5 km (0.93 mi)

Bystry Rów is a stream that flows within the bounds of the municipality of Szczecin, Poland.
