= Willy Nelle Villa =

Historic villa in Szczecin, Poland

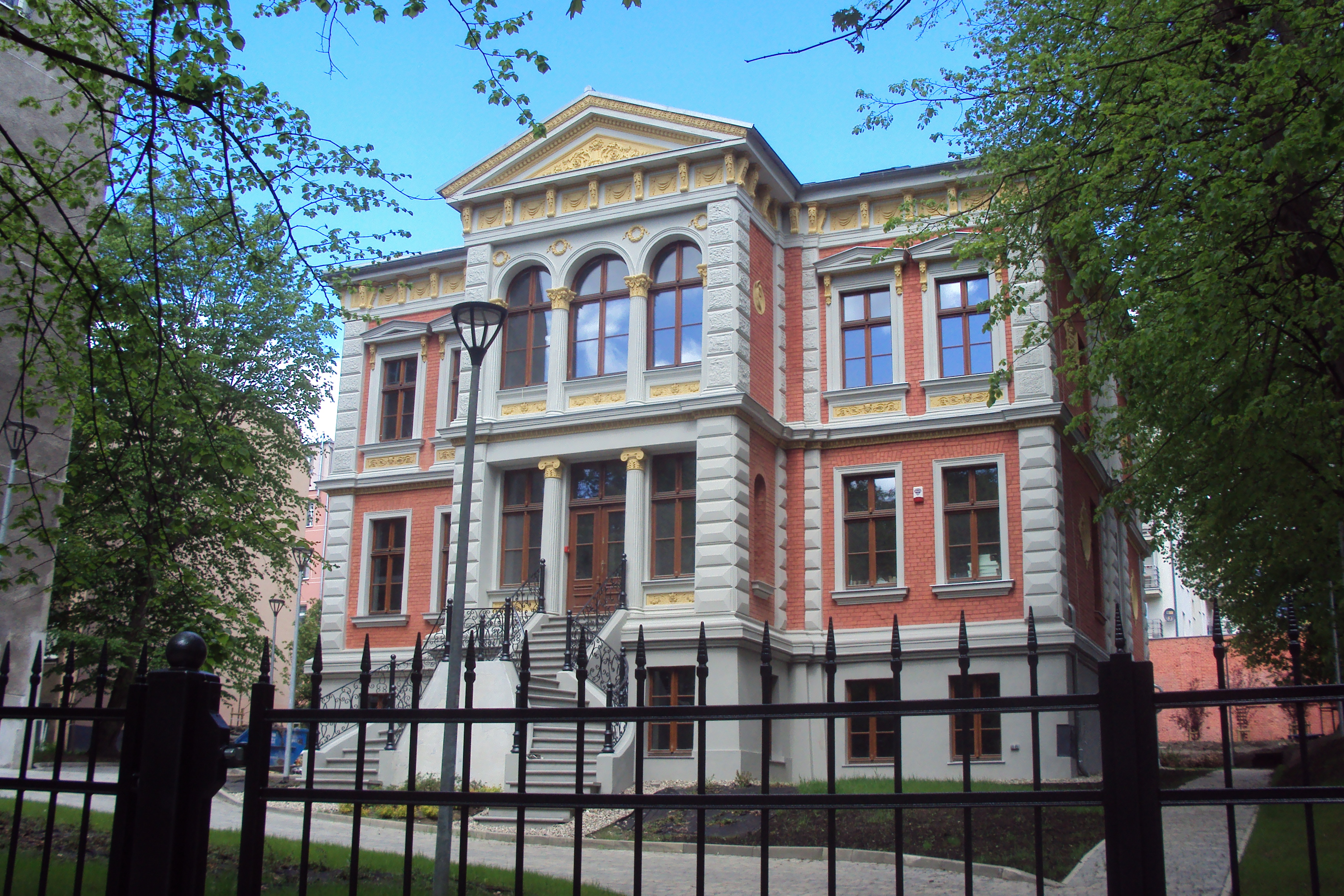
- The building in 2020.
- Interactive map of the Willy Nelle Villa area

General information
- Type: Villa
- Architectural style: Eclecticism, Renaissance Revival
- Location: 3 Słowackiego Street, Szczecin, Poland
- Coordinates: 53°26′41.4″N 14°32′32.7″E
- Completed: 1880

Technical details
- Floor count: 3

Design and construction
- Developer: Emil Otto

Willy Nelle Villa (German pronunciation: [ˈvɪ.li ˈneː.lə]; Polish: Willa Willy’ego Nellego; German: Willy-Nelles-Villa) is an eclectic villa in Szczecin, Poland, placed at 3 Słowackiego Street, within the neighbourhood of Niebuszewo-Bolinko. It was built in 1880. The building has the status of a protected cultural property.

== History ==
The villa was built in 1880, in the eclectic style, predominantly featuring elements of Renaissance Revival architecture. Its first owner was contractor Emil Otto. In 1905, it was bought by Willy Nelle, an owner of a nearby brewery. It was expanded with a horse stables and a carriage house, and was decorated with ornamentations, most of which does not survive to the present day. A large garden was established in its back, stretching to the current Barnima III Street. During the interwar period, the building belonged to roofer Paul Gläser. In the 1930s, a gas installation and central heating were added to the building.

From 1945 to 1947, it housed a police academy for the officers of the Citizens' Militia. Later, it was used as a residential building. In 1959, a paediatric clinic was opened there. In 1996, the building was privatised, and changed owers several times. Unused and abandoned, it eventually fell into the state of disrepair, and on 21 October 2017, its roof cave in. The building underwent renovations from March 2018 to April 2020.

In 1997, the building received the status of a protected cultural property.

== Characteristics ==
The villa has three storyes, and features an electic façade with lavish ornamentation, predominantly with the elements of the Renaissance Revival style. At the front, it has an avant-corps topped with a tympanum with Ionic engaged columns on the ground floor, and a triforium with Corinthian engaged columns on the first floor. The window panels feature acanthus leaves, and the inside has a painted ceiling depicting the scenes of the Bacchanalia. A row of linden trees grows in front of the building, and a maple tree grown on its western side.
