= Osiedle Tatrzańskie =

Housing estate in Szczecin, Poland

- Neighbourhood
- Interactive map of Osiedle Tatrzańskie
- Coordinates: 53.454534°N 14.523860°E
- Country: Poland
- Voivodeship: West Pomeranian
- City and county: Szczecin
- District: West
- Administrative neighbourhood: Arkońskie-Niemierzyn
- Time zone: UTC+1 (CET)
  - Summer (DST): UTC+2 (CEST)
- Area code: +48 91
- Car plates: ZS

Osiedle Tatrzańskie (Polish: [ɔˈɕɛ.dlɛ taˈtʂaɲ.skiɛ]; lit. 'Tatra Estate') is a housing estate in Szczecin, Poland, within the West district, in the administrative subdivision of Arkońskie-Niemierzyn. It consiststs apartment buildings located between Wiosny Ludów, Arkońska, and Tatrzańska Streets. It was developed in the 1970s.

== Toponomy ==
The name Osiedle Tatrzańskie, translates from Polish to "Tatra Estate". The neighbourhood was named after Tatrzańska Street (Polish: ulica Tatrzańska, lit. 'Tatra Street'), which in turn was named after the Tatra Mountains at the border of Poland and Slovakia.

== History ==
Osiedle Tatrzańskie was constructed in the 1970s, in an undeveloped area between Wiosny Ludów, Arkońska, and Tatrzańska Streets, to the north of the Independent Public Voivodeship Polyclinical Hospital. It was designed by Tadeusz Łyżwa and Jacek Przybylski as a housing estate, consisting of apartment builsings constructed with the large panel system technology.

On 28 November 1990, it was incorporated into the administrative neighbourhood of Arkońskie-Niemierzyn, governed by an elected neighbourhood council.

== Characteristics ==
Osiedle Tatrzańskie is a housing estate located between Wiosny Ludów, Arkońska, and Tatrzańska Streets. It consists of 5- and 11-storey apartment buildings, which were developed in the 1970s using the large panel system technology. Its connecting to the tram network with tracks placed allongside Arkońska Street.
