= Osiedle Arkońskie =

Housing estate in Szczecin, Poland

- Neighbourhood
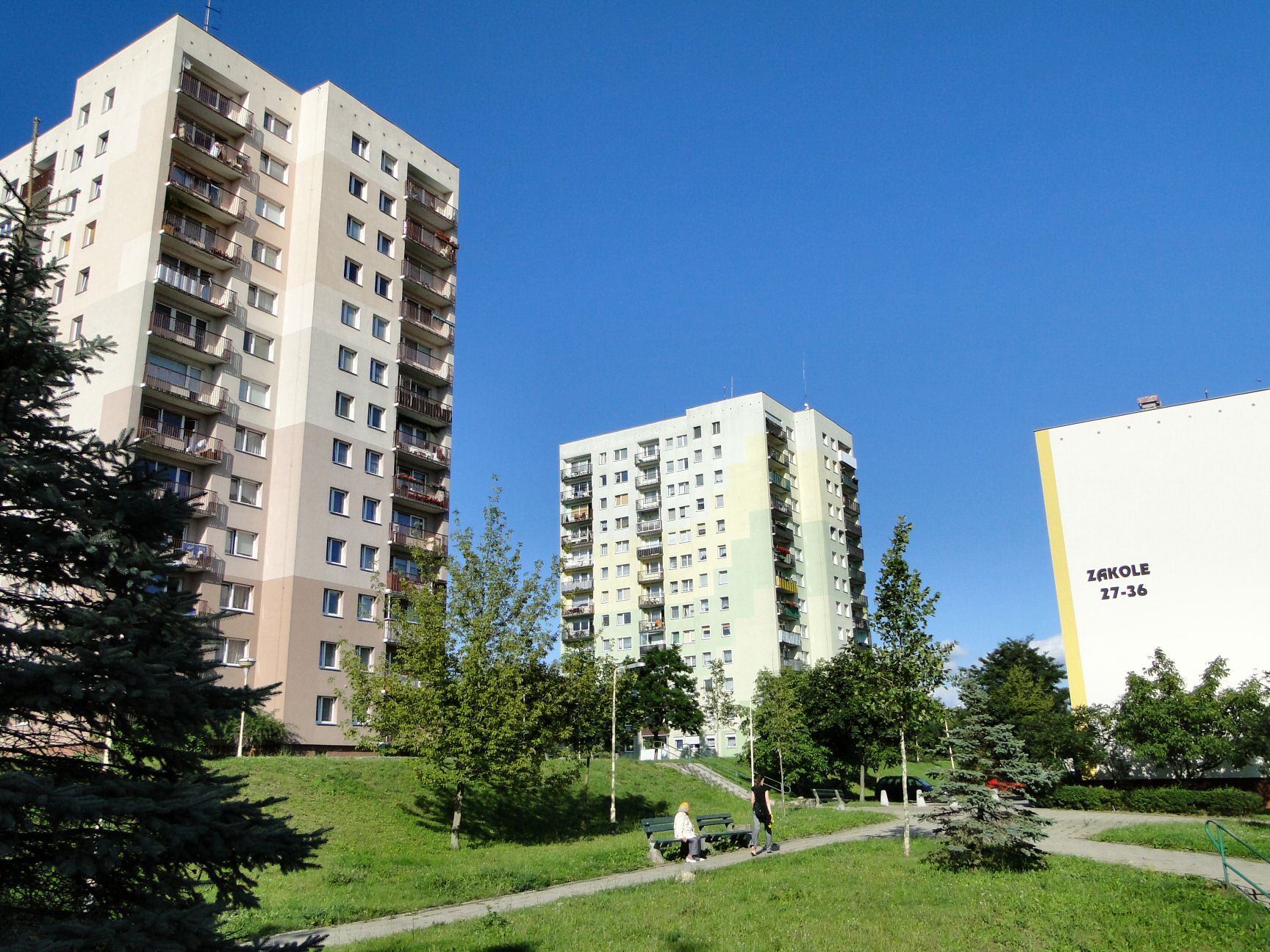
- The apartment buildings on Zakole Street.
- Interactive map of Osiedle Arkońskie
- Coordinates: 53.457593°N 14.536100°E
- Country: Poland
- Voivodeship: West Pomeranian
- City and county: Szczecin
- District: West
- Administrative neighbourhood: Arkońskie-Niemierzyn

Area
  - Total: 0.33 km^{2} (0.13 sq mi)
- Time zone: UTC+1 (CET)
  - Summer (DST): UTC+2 (CEST)
- Area code: +48 91
- Car plates: ZS

Osiedle Arkońskie (Polish: [ɔˈɕɛ.dlɛ ar.ˈkɔɲ.skjɛ]; lit. 'Arkona Estate') is a housing estate in Szczecin, Poland, within the West district, in the administrative subdivision of Arkońskie-Niemierzyn. It consiststs of 45 apartment buildings, located between Wiosny Ludów, Chopina, and Wszyskich Świetych Streets, covering an area of 33 ha. It was developed in the 1970s.

== Toponomy ==
The name Osiedle Arkońskie, translates from Polish to "Arkona Estate". The neighbourhood was named after the Arkona Woods located to its northeast. It in turn was named after 1945 after the Cape Arkona on the island of Rügen in Mecklenburg-Vorpommern, Germany, which featured an important settlement of the Polabian Slavs in the Early Middle Ages.

== History ==
Osiedle Arkońskie was constructed in the 1970s, on an undeveloped area between Wiosny Ludów, Chopina, and Wszyskich Świetych Streets, measuring 33 ha. It was designed by Tadeusz Łyżwa and Jacek Przybylski, as a large housing estate consisting of 45 residential buildings constructed with the large panel system technology. It included the construction of 10 high-rises and 35 mid-rise apartment buildings, with the total number of apartments units being 2,169, providing housing for arouns 6,000 people.

On 28 November 1990, it was incorporated into the administrative neighbourhood of Arkońskie-Niemierzyn, governed by an elected neighbourhood council.

== Characteristics ==
Osiedle Arkońskie is a large housing estate, located between Wiosny Ludów, Chopina, and Wszyskich Świetych Streets, with an area of 33 ha. It consists of 45 residential buildings, including 10 high-rises and 35 mid-rise apartment buildings, providing housing for arouns 6,000 resident. They were constructed in the 1970s using the large panel system.
