= Stefan Kownas Arboretum =

Arboretum in Szczecin, Poland

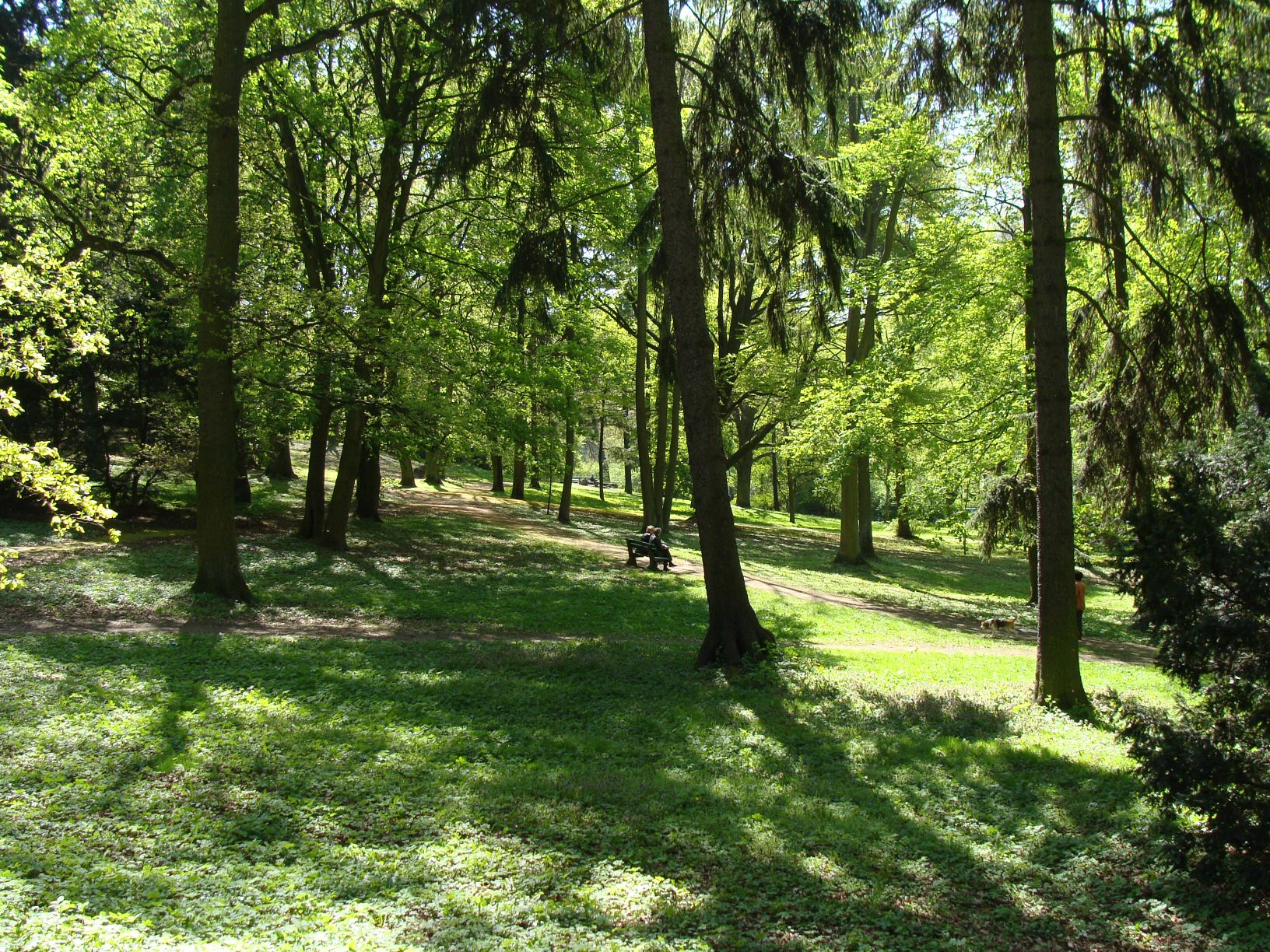
- The Stefan Kownas Arboretum in 2009.
- Interactive map of Stefan Kownas Arboretum
- Type: Arboretum
- Location: Szczecin, Poland
- Coordinates: 53°26′50.71″N 14°32′06.38″E
- Area: 15.5 hectares (38 acres)
- Created: 1975

The Stefan Kownas Arboretum (Polish: [ˈstɛ.fan ˈkɔv.nas]; Polish: Ogród Dendrologiczny im. Stefana Kownasa) is an arboretum garden in Szczecin, Poland. It is located in the administrative neighbourhood of Niebuszewo-Bolinko, between Niemierzyńska, Żupańskiego, and Słowackiego Streets. The garden borders the Jan Kasprowicz Park to the southwest. It was opened in 1975, in place of the former Niemierzyn Cemetery, which dated to 1868.

== History ==
The area was originally developed as the Niemierzyn Cemetery, opened on 12 October 1868 to serve the population of the nearby village of Niemierzyn (now a neighbourhood of Szczecin). Soon, it also became popular among upper class of the nearby city. In 1900, the cemetery and the village were incorporated into the city of Szczecin, and soon after there was constructed a chappel, and in 1905, it was expanded to the northwest.

During the Second World War the cemetery was used as a burial ground for victims of the allied bombing air raids. There was also constructed an underground bunker.

Following the expulsion of the German population after the war, the necropolis begun being used by the arriving Polish population. It was renamed to the Town Square Cemetery (Polish: Cmentarz Majdański). It was closed down in the 1950s. Between 1973 and 1975, the area was redeveloped into an arboretum garden, with all gravestones being removed and the chappel and most of the walls being deconstructed. It was originally known as the Arboretum Park (Polish: Park Dendrologiczny), and in 1978, it was renamed to its current name, after Stefan Kownas, a 20th-century botanist and professor at the Agricultural University of Szczecin.

The pathways layout of the cemetery have been preserved, and some gravestones were used to build walls next to Słowackiego and Niemierzyńska Streets.

== Characteristics ==
The garden has an area of 15.5 ha, and is located between Niemierzyńska, Żupańskiego, and Słowackiego Streets. It is an arboretum with 82 recorded species of trees and bushes. Some of them are: black poplar, common yew, European beech, pedunculate oak, sessile oak. There's also a European ash tree, overgrown with the common ivy, that has the status of a natural monument. The garden also includes several Glacial erratic rocks, the largest of which is named in commemoration of Juliusz Słowacki, a 19th-century Romantic poet. The garden borders the Jan Kasprowicz Park to the southwest.
