= Niemierzyn Cemetery =

Former cemetery in Szczecin, Poland

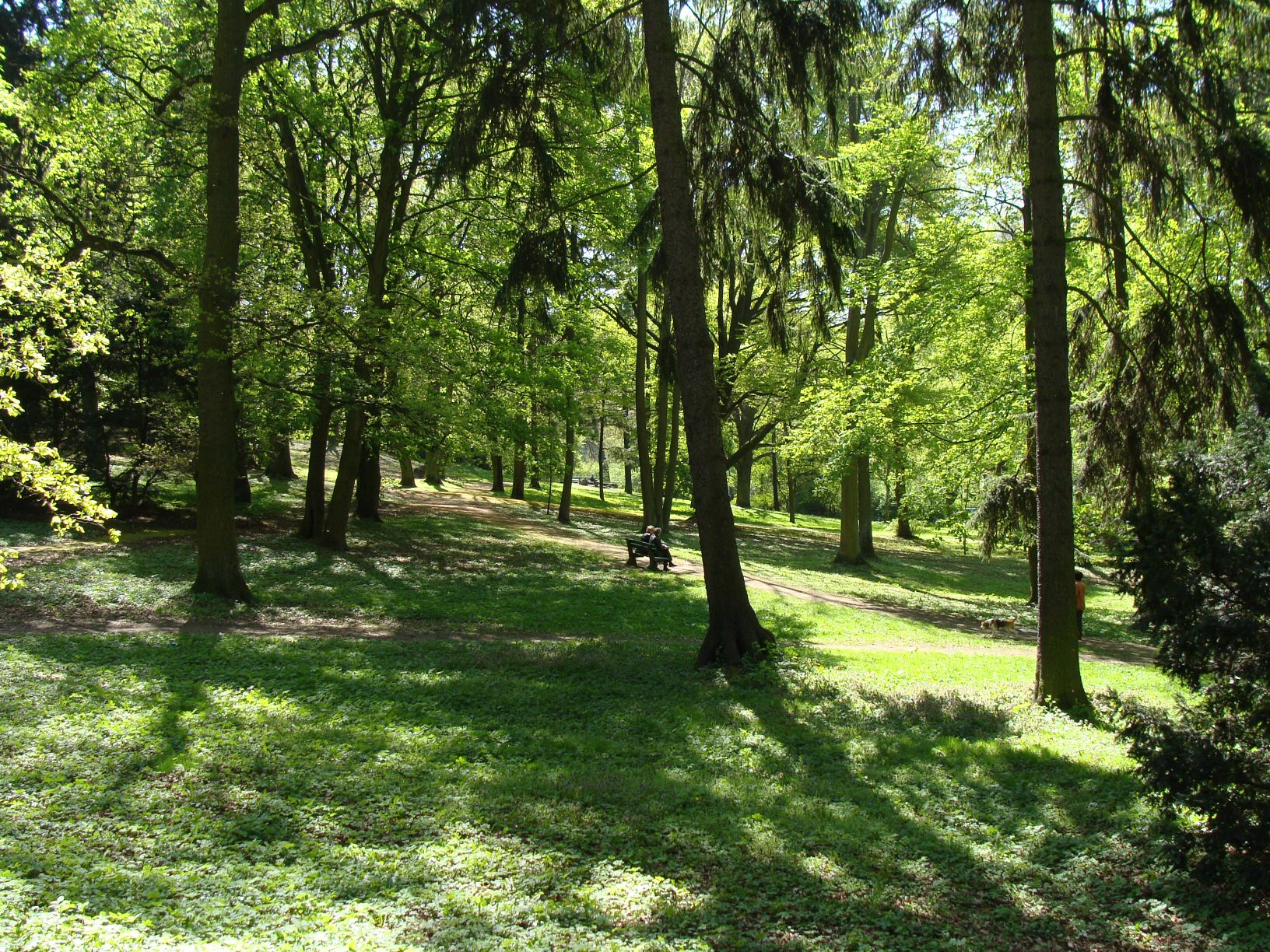
- The Stefan Kownas Arboretum in 2009, the former location of the Niemierzyn Cemetery.
- Interactive map of Niemierzyn Cemetery

Details
- Established: 12 October 1868
- Closed: 1950s (closed); 1975 (demolished)
- Location: Szczecin
- Country: Poland
- Coordinates: 53°26′50.71″N 14°32′06.38″E
- Size: 15.5 ha (38 acres)

The Niemierzyn Cemetery (Polish: [ɲɛ.mjɛˈʐɘ̟n]; Polish: Cmentarz Niemierzyński; German: Nemitzer Friedhof), known between 1945 and 1975 as the Town Square Cemetery (Polish: Cmentarz Majdański), was a cemetery in Szczecin, Poland, within the administrative neighbourhood of Niebuszewo-Bolinko. It was operated from 1868 to the 1950s, and was demolished between 1973 and 1975, being replaced with the Stefan Kownas Arboretum. It had an area of 15.5 ha, and was placed between Niemierzyńska, Żupańskiego, and Słowackiego Streets.

== History ==
The cemetery was founded on 12 October 1868, to serve the population of the nearby village of Niemierzyn (now a neighbourhood of Szczecin). Its location on a small hill attracted upper-class people of the nearby city who also begun using it. In 1872, there was buried a prominent writer Robert Eduard Prutz.

In 1900, the cemetery and the village were incorporated into the city of Szczecin, and soon after there was constructed a chappel, and in 1905, it was expanded to the northwest. It was surrounded by a brick wall with steel bars.

During the Second World War the cemetery was used as a burial ground for victims of the allied bombing air raids. There was also constructed an underground bunker.

Following the expulsion of the German population after the war, the necropolis begun being used by the arriving Polish population. It was renamed to the Town Square Cemetery (Polish: Cmentarz Majdański). It was closed down in the 1950s. Between 1973 and 1975, the area was redeveloped into an arboretum garden, with all gravestones being removed and the chapel and most of the walls being deconstructed. In 1978, it was named the Stefan Kownas Arboretum.
