= Museum of Technology and Transport =

Museum in Szczecin, Poland

Coordinates: 53.4482°N 14.5406°E

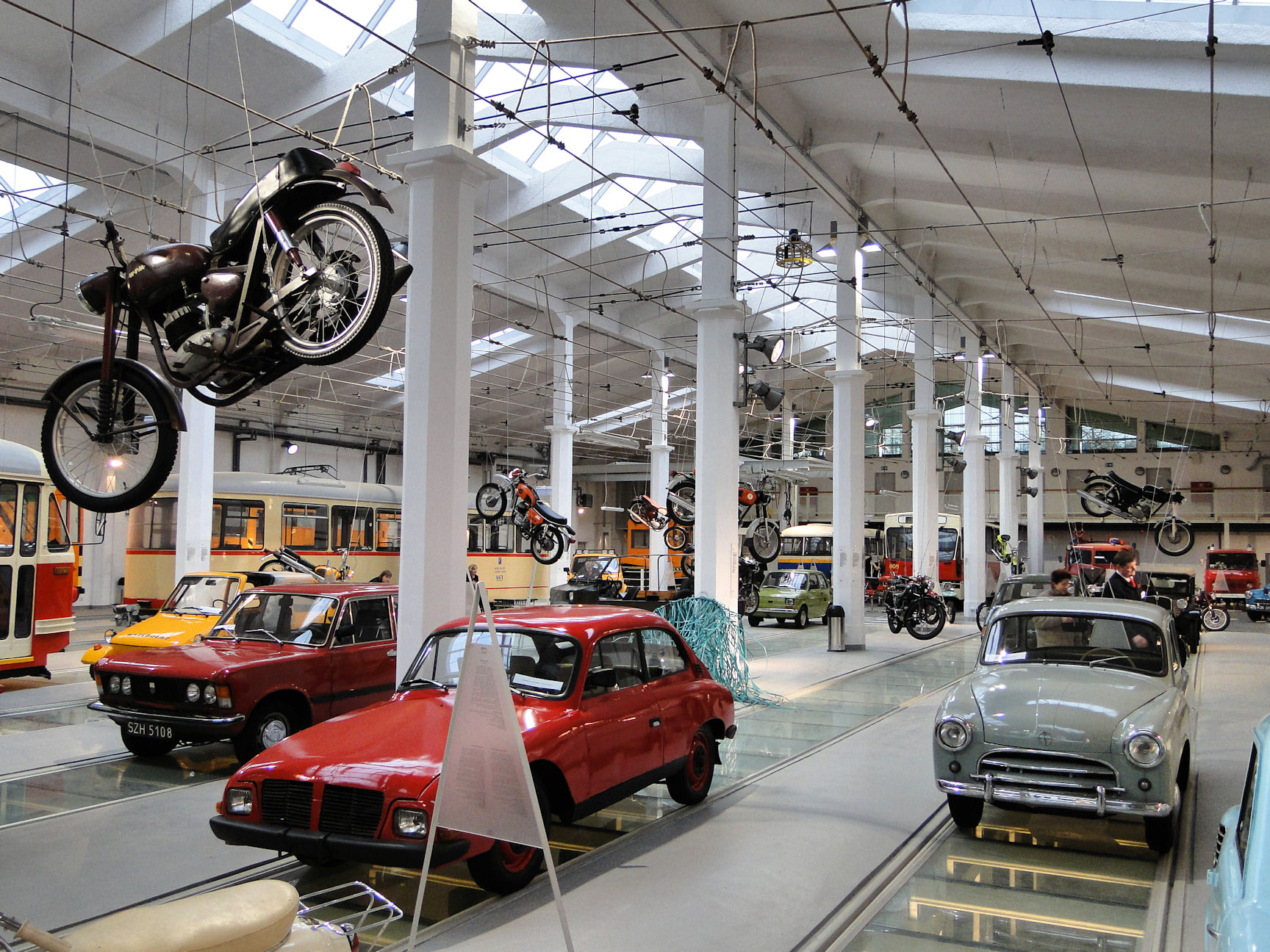
Museum interior

The Museum of Technology and Transport – Art Depot (Polish: Muzeum Techniki i Komunikacji – Zajezdnia Sztuki) in Szczecin, Poland was established in 2006. The main themes of it are related to road transport. It is supervised by the local government.

It has a series of specialized exibutions, such as "Cars of Socialist States", (Note: "Socialist States" here is the self-reference of the Eastern Bloc states known as the "Communist states" in the West) "Microcars", "Motorcycles of the Second Polish Republic", etc.

It was established in the abandoned tram depot Niemerzyn by the Niemierzyńska Street. The costs of its renovation was expected to be too high, and it was transferred to the city property. The Szczecin Society of Public Transport Enthusiasts found funding to create the museum there.

The collection of the museum includes trams, buses, cars, motorcycles, bicycles, electronic equipment, household appliances, etc. The most valuable contribution to the collection are 32 vintage cars and 56 motorcycles purchased from the Warsaw collector Leszek Liszewski for 1.2 million Polish złotys.
