= Niebuszewo =

- Municipal neighbourhood
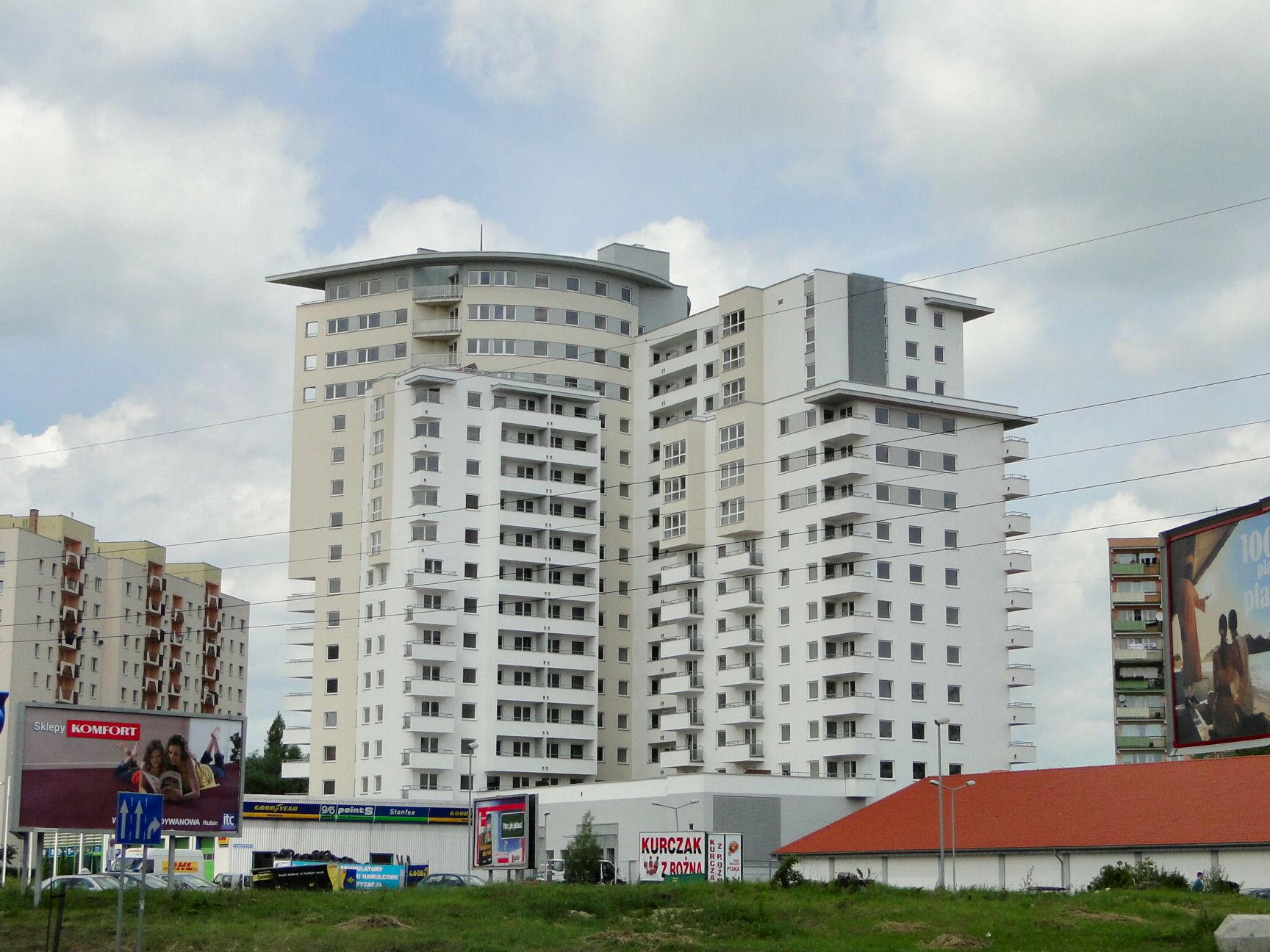
- Widok building in Niebuszewo

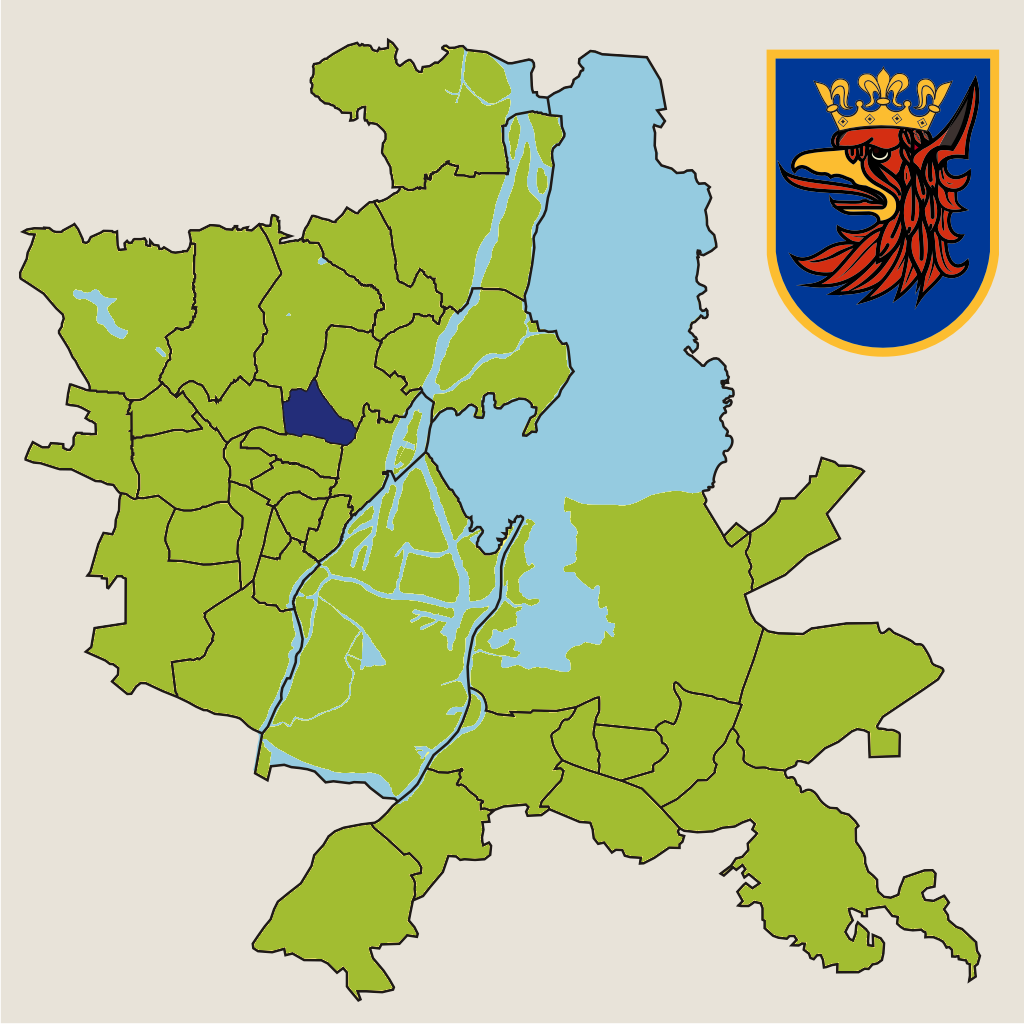
- Location of Niebuszewo within Szczecin
- Coordinates: 53°27′18.27″N 14°32′50.64″E
- Country: Poland
- Voivodeship: West Pomeranian
- County/City: Szczecin

Population (2011)
  - Total: 17,654
- Time zone: UTC+1 (CET)
  - Summer (DST): UTC+2 (CEST)
- Area code: +48 91
- Car plates: ZS

Niebuszewo is a municipal neighbourhood of the city of Szczecin, Poland, in Północ (North) District, north of the Szczecin Old Town and Downtown. As of January 2011 it had a population of 17,654.

== History ==
The area became part of the emerging Duchy of Poland under its first ruler Mieszko I around 967. Following Poland's fragmentation after the death of Bolesław III Wrymouth in 1138 it became part of an independent Duchy of Pomerania, which in 1227 became part of the Holy Roman Empire. It became known as Zabelsdorf in German. During the Thirty Years' War, the settlement fell to the Swedish Empire, but stayed part of the Holy Roman Empire. Later on, it passed to the Prussia, and from 1871 to 1945 it was part of the German Empire. In 1945, following the end of World War II the area became part of Poland.

== See also ==
- Niebuszewo-Bolinko
