= City district =

Type of administrative division

A city district, also known as an urban district or neighbourhood, is a designated administrative division that is generally managed by a local government. It is used to divide a city into several administrative units.

City districts are used in Russia (raion), Pakistan and Croatia (Croatian: gradski kotar or gradska četvrt).

The term is also the English translation for the German Stadtbezirk; French arrondissements; Dutch stadsdeel; Swedish stadsdel and Polish dzielnica.

== By country/region ==
Country	Term/Translation	Example	Subdivision of	Administrative power	Notes	Further Reading
Russia	District (Russian: raion)	Sovetsky City District, Nizhny Novgorod	Federal subject/federal city	Local Government(City assembly)	A Russian raion is a second-level administrative unit, two levels below national subdivision.	Districts of Russia
Germany	Borough	Wattenscheid, Bochum.	Metropolis	Municipal Government (Mayor)	German city districts are allocated only in urban metropolis' of more than 150,000 occupants. These boroughs subdivide the city-states (German: Stadtbezirk)	Stadtbezirk
France	Municipal arrondissement (French: arrondissement municipal)	Panthéon, Paris	Major city (Paris, Lyon and Marseille)	Municipal Government (Mayor)	Belgium, Haiti, and other certain Francophone countries use arrondissements as administrative units.	Municipal arrondissement
China	County-level subdivisions (districts) (市辖区 / 区; shìxiáqū / qū)	Yaohai, Hefei	Municipality or prefecture-level city	Local Government	In China, districts, wards or sub-cities (Chinese: 区) are subdivisions of a municipality or ‘prefecture-level city’.	Districts of China
Czech Republic	City district (Czech: městský obvod, městská část)	Brno-Královo Pole	statutory city	City district assembly (zastupitelstvo městského obvodu, zastupitelstvo městské části)	A statutory city can choose to divide some or all of its territory into self-governing city districts in its statute. The Municipality Act defines two types of divisions (městský obvod and městská část) although they are equivalent in all but name.	
Indonesia	District or urban village (Indonesian: Kecamatan)	Menteng, Central Jakarta	Regency (Kabupaten) or city	District office (Kantor kecamatan)	In the Papuan provinces, city districts are called distrik, while in Yogyakarta, they are called kemantren	Districts of Indonesia
Pakistan	Urdu: اِضلاعِ پاكِستان; Sindhi: پاڪستان جا ضلعا	Karachi Central District, Sindh	Urban area (small city/ large metropolitan area)	Local Government (Union Council Administration)	While there are 150 total districts in Pakistan, only 11 have been designated city districts.	City Districts of Pakistan
Mexico, Mexico City	Boroughs/Alcadias, Federal District (Spanish: districto federal)	Centro, Mexico City	Metropolitan area	Head of Government	For administrative purposes, Mexico City is divided into 16 alcadias (councils).	Boroughs
Croatia	Croatian: gradski kotar or gradska četvrt	Gornja Dubrava, Zagreb	City / town	Local Government	Local government in Croatian city districts is a form of local self-government, whereby citizens participate in the self-governing scope of the city and local affairs.	
Netherlands	Dutch: stadsdeel	Centrum(Centre), Amsterdam	Major city	Local Government (District committee)	In some of the larger municipalities of the Netherlands, urban municipality districts are divided by city districts. Amsterdam calls 7 of its 8 deelgemeenten, stadsdeel.	Urban districts of the Netherlands
Sweden	Swedish: stadsdel	Holmsund, Västerbotten	Municipality	Local Government (Administrative board)	In some rare cases, large municipalities in Sweden are divided into smaller "city districts".	Districts of Sweden
Poland	Polish: dzielnica	Stare Miasto, Kraków	City/town	Mayor/Elected Council; (Polish: burmistrz, dzielnica council)		Dzielnica
Turkey	District Municipality (Turkish: büyükşehir belediyeleri)		Metropolitan Municipality	Mayor (of metropolitan municipality)		Metropolitan municipalities in Turkey

=== Russia (raion) ===
In Russia, a city district (raion) is a second-level administrative unit used to divide a city. It is the standardised administration unit of numerous post-Soviet states, two levels below national subdivision.

=== Germany (Stadtbezirk) ===
In Germany, a city district (Stadtbezirk) is an administrative unit that divides a metropolis of more than 150,000 inhabitants.

=== France and Francophonie (arrondissements) ===
A city district, or municipal arrondissement (French: arrondissement municipal [aʁɔ̃dismɑ̃ mynisipal]), is a subdividing unit used in France's three largest cities: Paris, Lyon and Marseille. It divides a commune within which it has its own mayor.

An arrondissement is also a term used for administrative divisions in areas such as Belgium, Haiti, and other certain Francophone countries.

=== Mexico City (borough) ===
There are 16 city districts of Mexico City: 15 subdivisions formally known as boroughs, and the Distrito Federal ('federal district').

== See also ==
- City Districts of Pakistan
