= Niebuszewo-Bolinko =

- Municipal neighbourhood
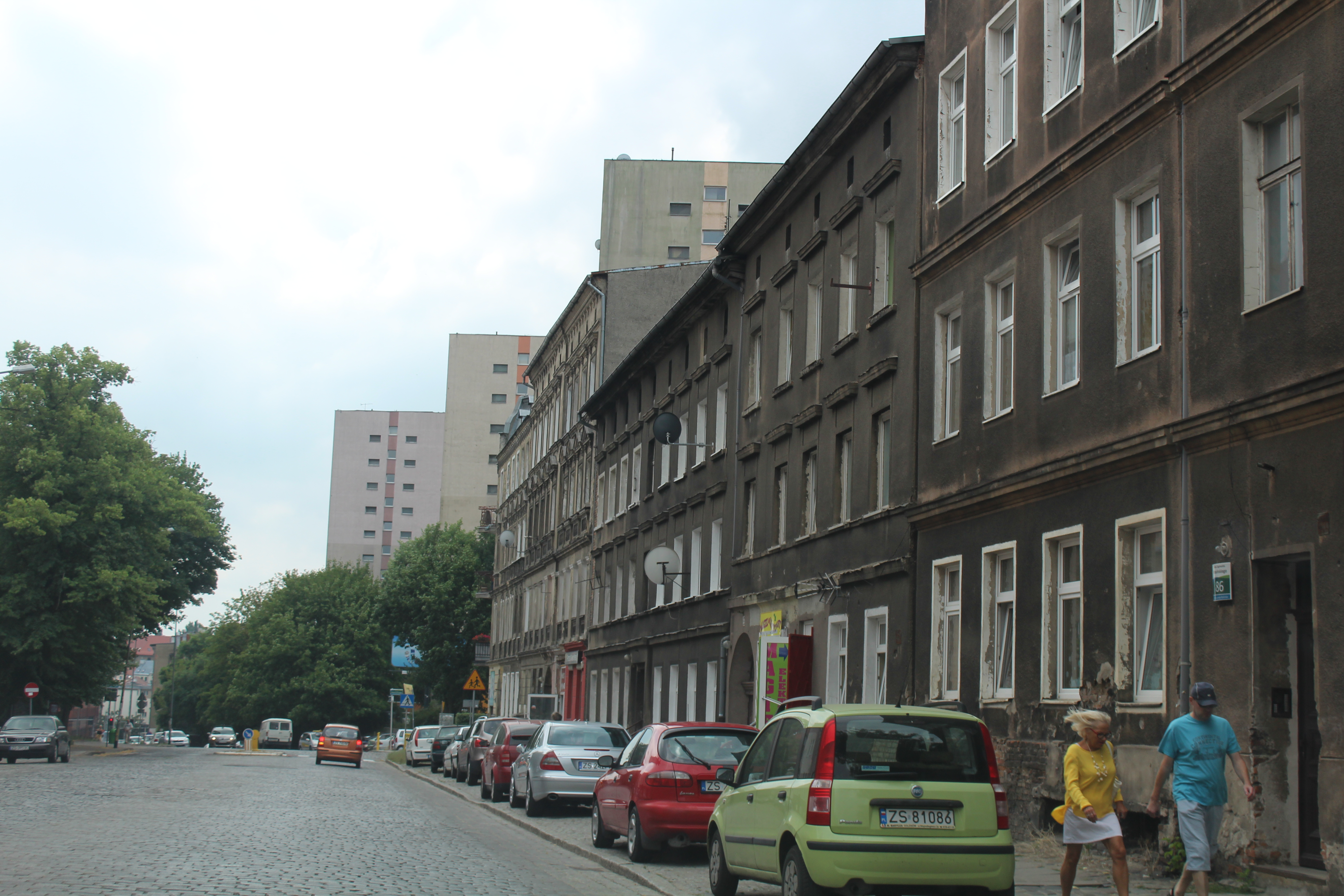
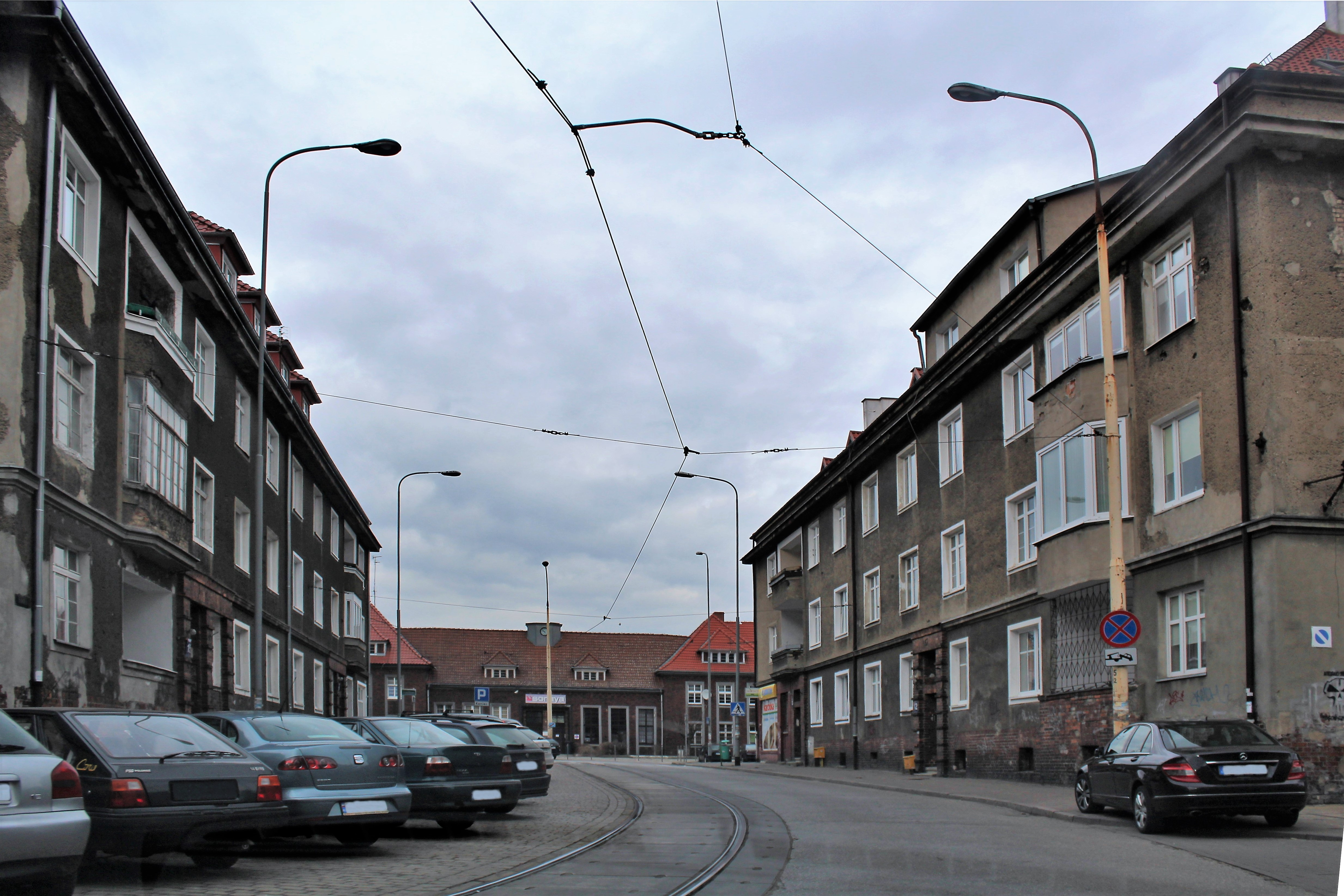
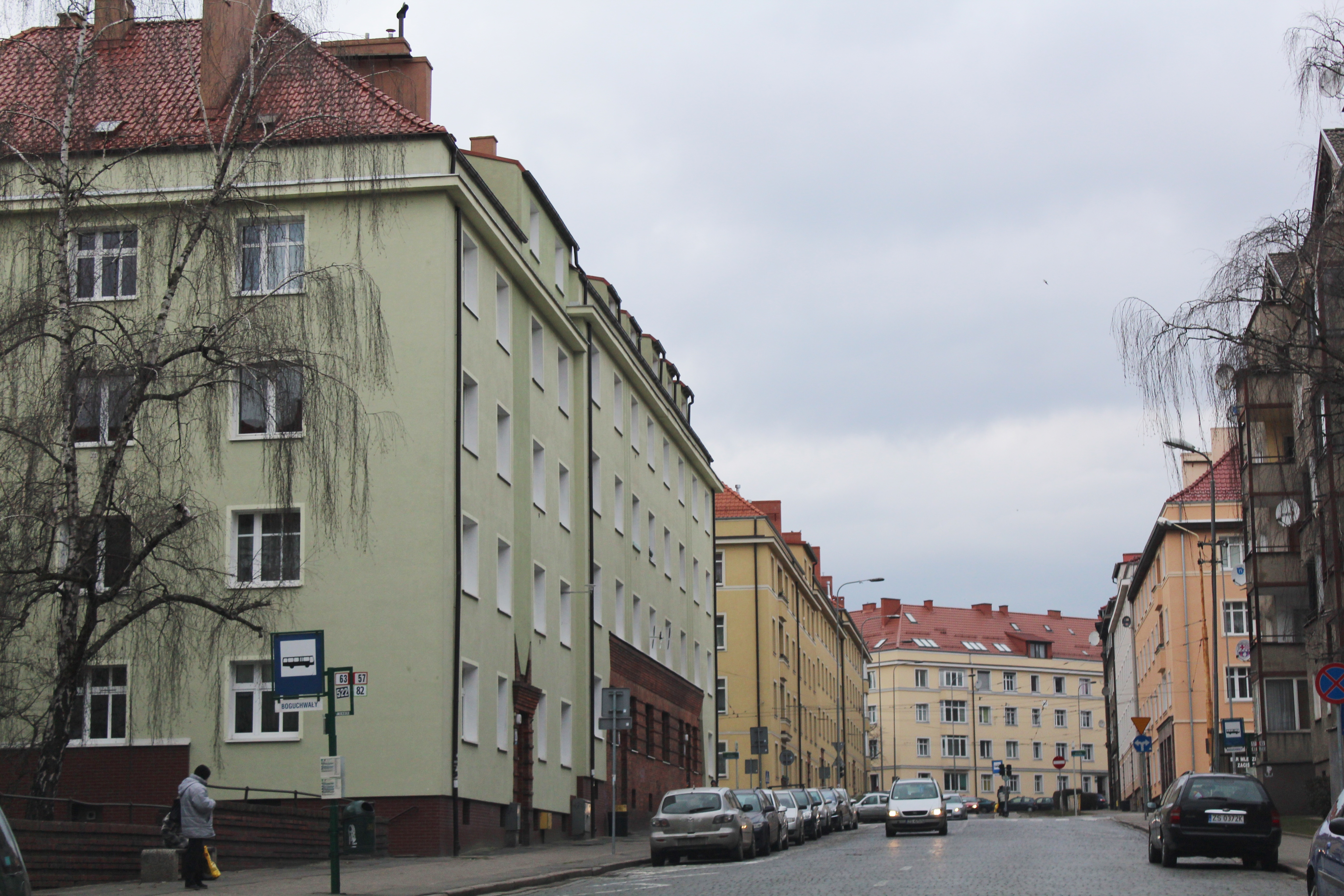
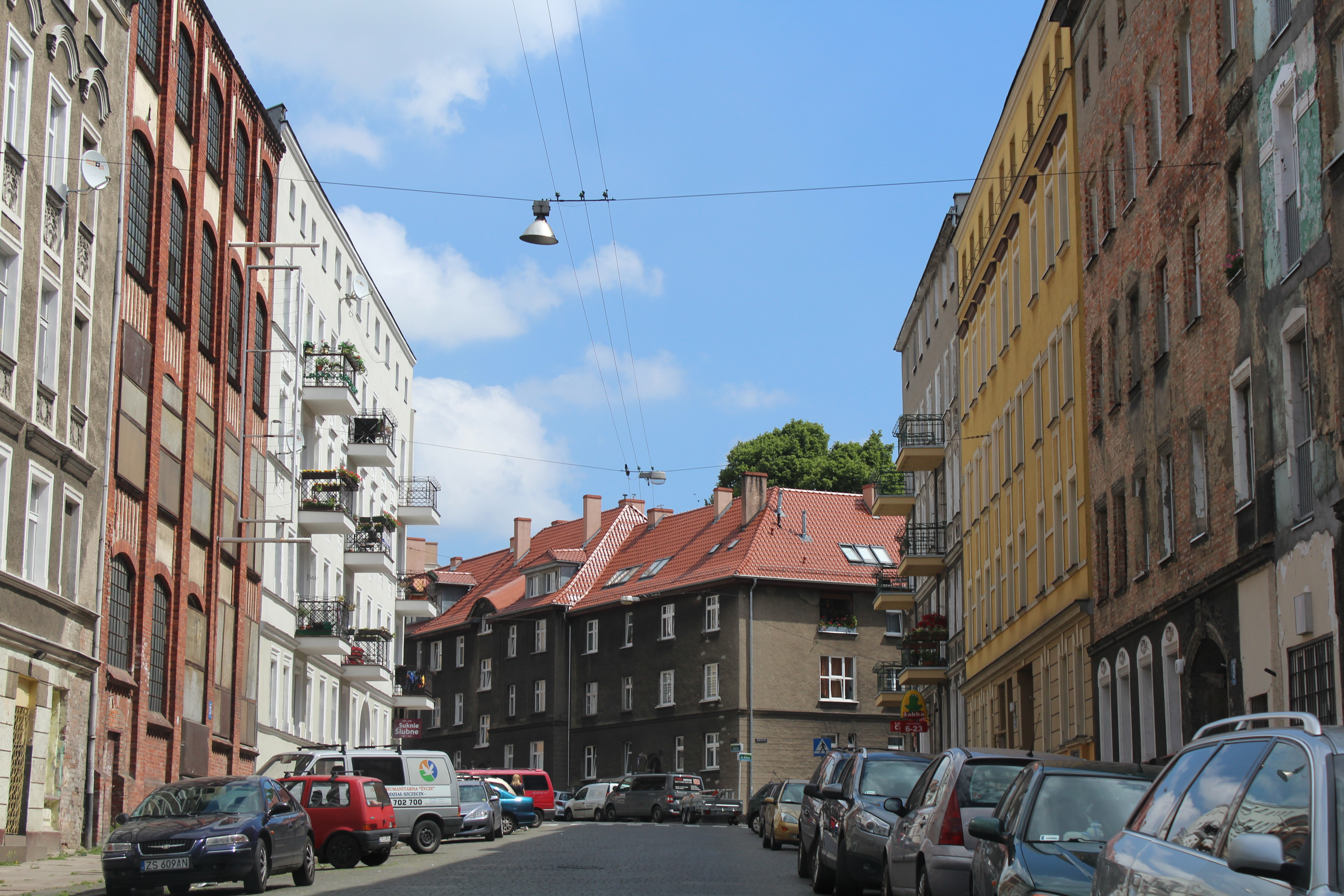
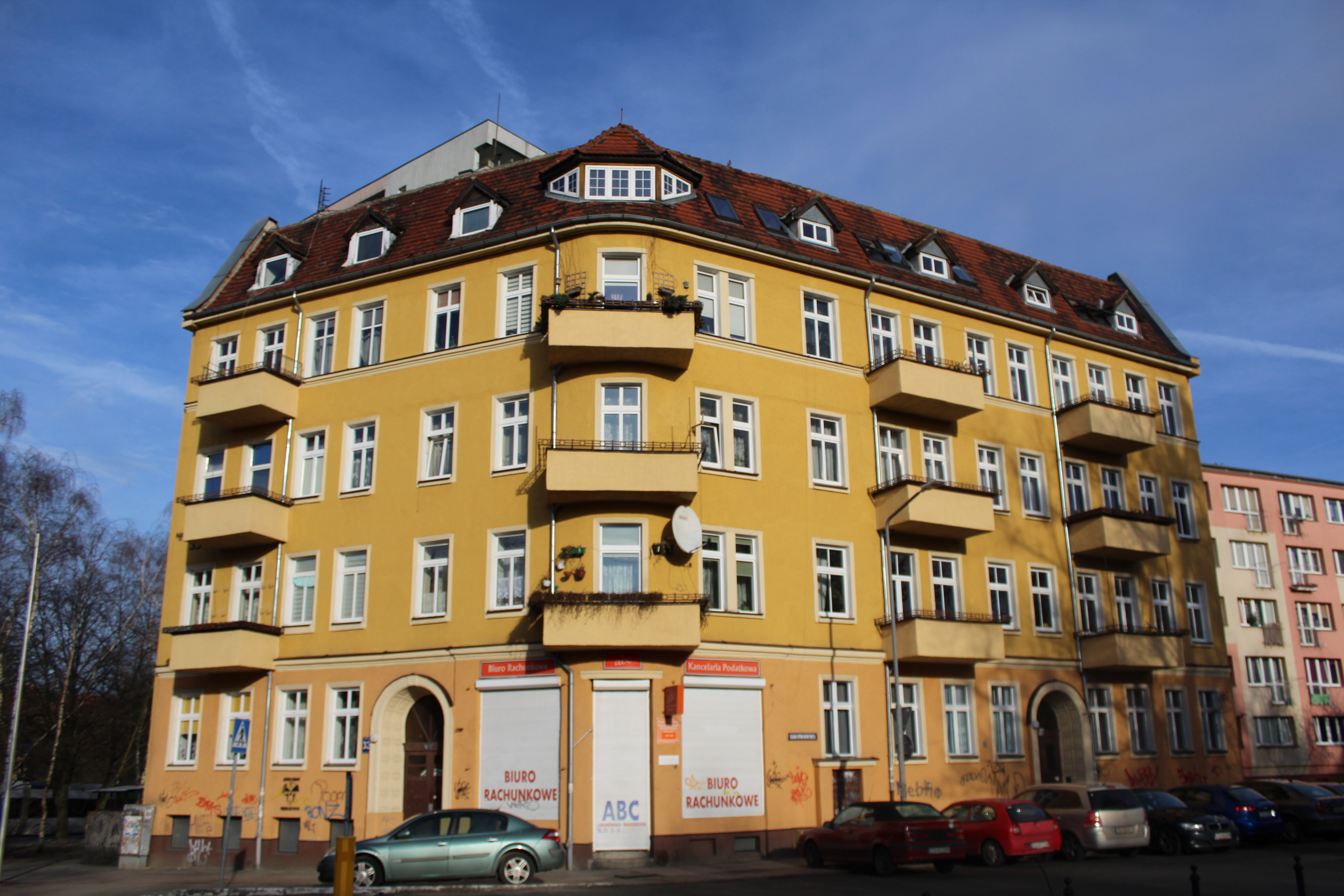
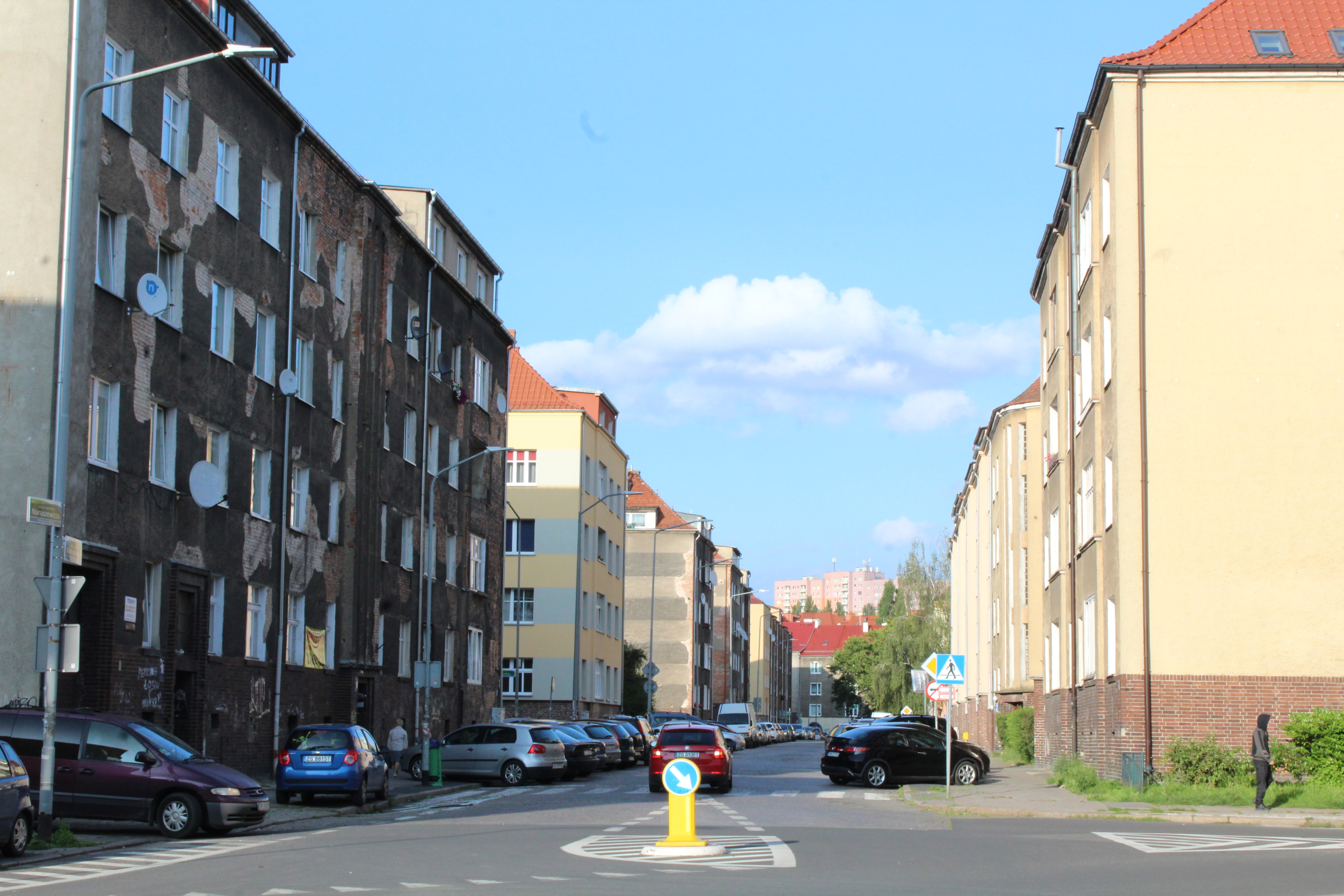
- Niebuszewo-Bolinko

- Location of Niebuszewo-Bolinko within Szczecin
- Coordinates: 53°26′38″N 14°32′51″E
- Country: Poland
- Voivodeship: West Pomeranian
- County/City: Szczecin

Population (2011)
  - Total: 22,403
- Time zone: UTC+1 (CET)
  - Summer (DST): UTC+2 (CEST)
- Area code: +48 91
- Car plates: ZS

Niebuszewo-Bolinko is a municipal neighbourhood of the city of Szczecin, Poland, in Śródmieście (Centre) District, north of the Szczecin Old Town. As of January 2011, it had a population of 22,403.

== See also ==
- Niebuszewo
