= Osów =

Neighbourhood of Szczecin, Poland

- Administrative neighbourhood
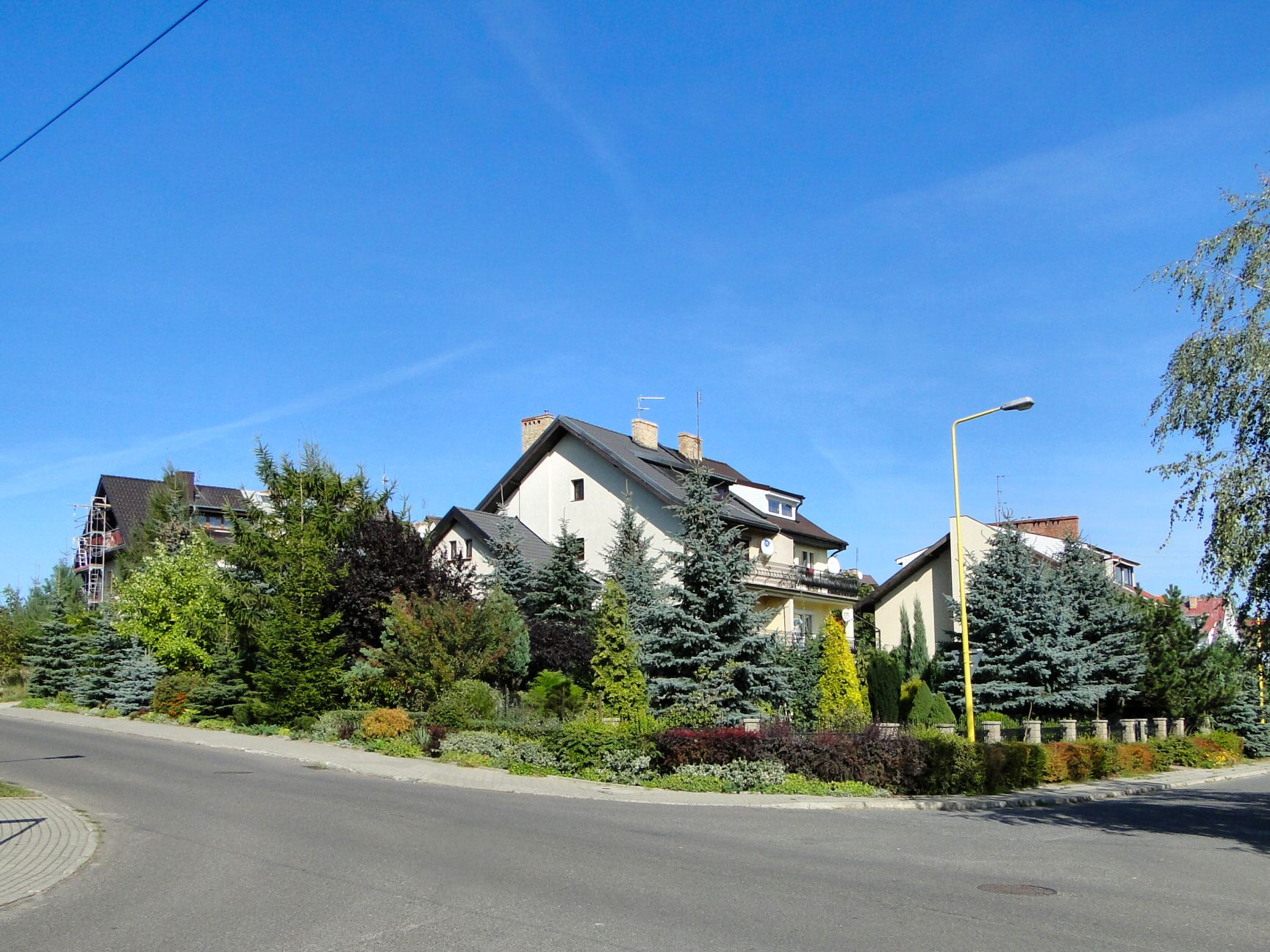
- Houses in Osów.

- The location of Osów within Szczecin.
- Coordinates: 53°28′46″N 14°30′55″E
- Country: Poland
- Voivodeship: West Pomeranian
- City and county: Szczecin
- District: West

Area
  - Total: 8.14 km^{2} (3.14 sq mi)

Population (2025)
  - Total: 5,105
- Time zone: UTC+1 (CET)
  - Summer (DST): UTC+2 (CEST)
- Area code: +48 91
- Car plates: ZS

Osów (Polish: [ˈɔ.suf]; German until 1945: Wussow [ˈvʊs.oː]) is an administrative neighbourhood forming a subdivision of the West district in the city of Szczecin, Poland. It is a residential area with low-rise single-family housing. The neighbourhood has an area of 8.14 km^{2} (3.14 sq mi), and in 2025, was inhabited by 5,105 people. Around ⅔ of its area is covered by the Ueckermünde Heath, including the Arkona Forest Park. The neighbourhood features the Church of Our Lady of Sorrows, a Roman Catholic parish church dating to the year 1900, and ruins of the Quistorp Tower, a Gothic Revival tower with observation deck, which was built in 1904, and demolished between 1944 and 1945. The area also includes Arkonka, one of the largest outdoor swimming pool complexes in Europe, with the total area of 7 ha, and combined swimming area of 8,012 m^{2}.

The first human settlements were founded in the area at the turn of the Bronze and Iron Age. In 1277, the village of Osów was sold by Barnim I, the Duke of Pomerania to the city of Szczecin. The community operated seven gristmills alongside Osówka river, of which only one was preserved to the present day. In the 1930s, the area developed into a small suburb, and was incorporated into the city in 1939.

== History ==
The oldest archaeological findings in the modern area of Osów come from the neolithic period, while the first settlements were founded there at the turn of the Bronze and Iron Age. They belonged to the Hallstatt culture. At the time, the area included three large settlements. In the Early Middle Ages, a hamlet was also probably founded in the area. Its remains were destroyed in the interwar period by the sand mining conducted in the area. Archaeological findings confirm a presence of a hamlet sometime between 10th and 13th centuries.

In 1271, the village of Osów (German: Wussow) was granted as a fiefdom to Wezelo, a resident of Szczecin who was a vassal of the Duke of Pomerania. In 1277 it was bought by duke Barnim I, the ruler of the Duchy of Pomerania, who then granted its ownership to the city of Szczecin, with 54 voloks of land. It included the ownership of all of its buildings. The document was reconfirmed by duke Bogislaw IV in 1293, by duke Otto I in 1308, and duke Wartislaw IV in 1309. At the time, Osów was a small farming community, placed alongside the current Miodowa Street. The village was surrounded by the Ueckermünde Heath, and by the 17th century, it included a forester's lodge.

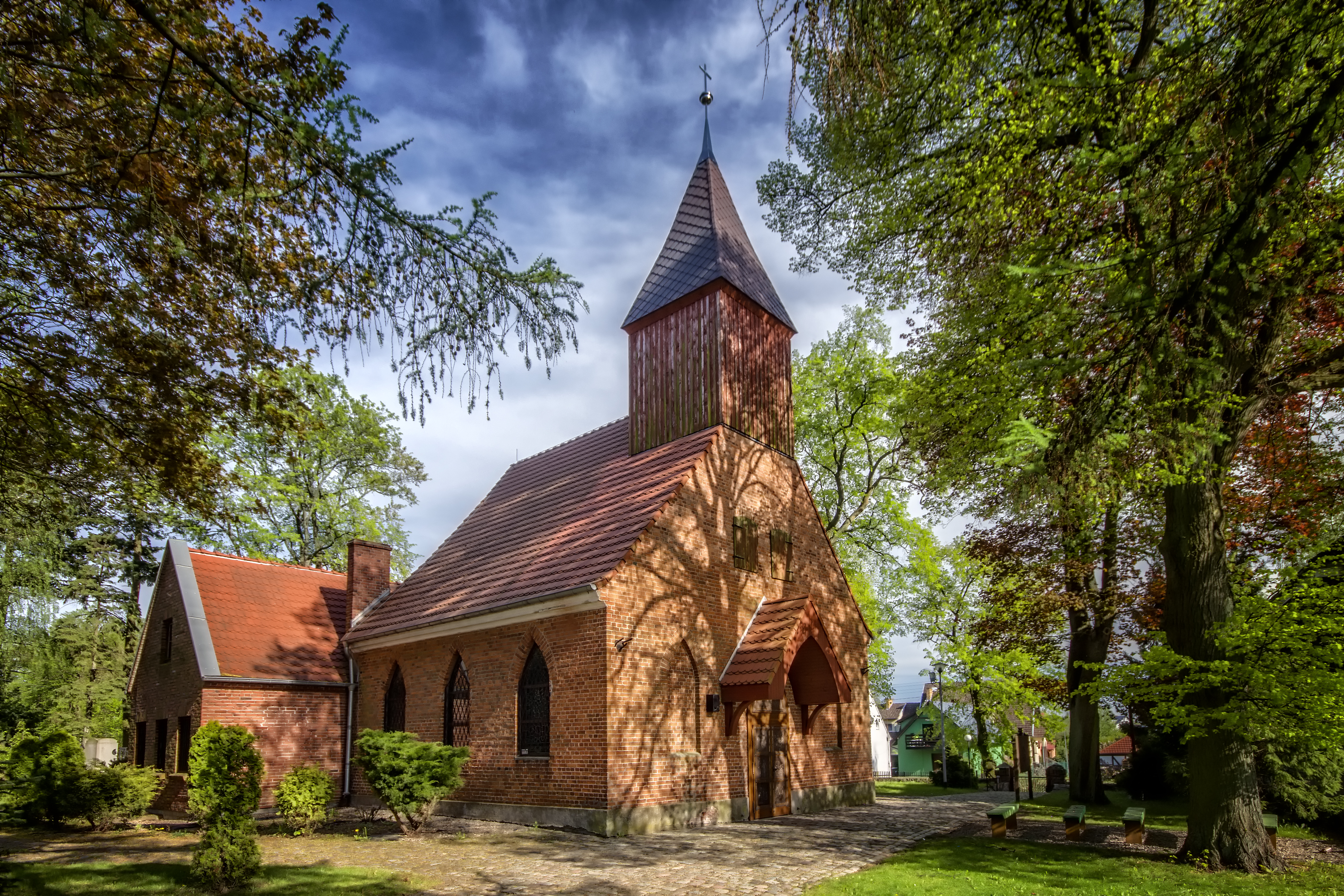
The Church of Our Lady of Sorrows, built in the year 1900.

Around 1283, the Church of Our Lady of Sorrows was built at the current 47 Miodowa Street. It originally belonged to the Roman Catholic denomination, and later, following the Reformation, to the Lutheran denomination. In 1286, the Bishop of Cammin, Hermann von Gleichen, granted the jurisdiction over it to the St. Mary Church in Szczecin. The building was rebuilt in 17th century, and was later demolished in the 19th century, due to being in a bad condition. A new church building was constructed in its place in the year 1900. In 1947, its denomination was changed back to the Roman Catholicism. In the 13th century, a cemetery was opened in the churchyard, remaining open for burials until 1870. Two more cemeteries were established nearby on Kwiatów Polskich Street around 1870, and on Mokra Street in 1910. The former was closed down in 1938, and the later in 1948. After 1945, the gravestones were removed from the cemeteries on Miodowa and Kwiatów Polskich Streets, without conducting exhumations. In the 1970s, they were also removed from the cemetery on Mokra Street, with only bodies of Polish people being exhumated. In 2004, a small lapidarium was established there, using several abandoned gravestones.

In the Early Middle Ages, seven gristmills were built alongside the Osówka stream, located to the north of Osów, and characterised by its strong current. The oldest mention of them come from 1277, when one of the mills was sold to the city by duke Barnim I. The rest of them were also bought by Szczecin in 1643. Additionally, the Steinfurth Mill was also built on the coast of Martin Lake, connected to Osówka stream, to the south of Osów, as part of the farming estate of the village of Niemierzyn. The oldest records of its presence date to 1335. In the 19th century, the gristmills were refitted with steam engines, and later with diesel and electric engines. All but one of the Osów mills were demolished sometime after in 1945, leaving behind a series of small lakes, with the area being now known as the Seven Mills Valley. The Steinfurth Mill was instead also readopted into a forester's lodge, named the Red Forester's Lodge, and was eventually deconstructed in the 1990s.

In 1677, the village of Osów, as well as surrounded gristmills were destroyed during a siege of Szczecin in the Scanian War, and were rebuilt afterwards.

In the first half of the 19th century, a hydrotherapy centre was founded in the Arkona Woods to the north of Niemierzyn. It was later transformed into a bathing complex, and reopened as a hydrotherapy centre in 1860. It was demolished in 1890, and replaced with a new hydrotherapy hospital, predominantly for people with mental disorders. It also hosted cultural events such as concerts and dancing. After the end of the Second World War, it operated as a rehabilitation centre and resort for children. Since 1991, it houses the St. Brother Albert Youth Sociotherapy Center, a Roman Catholic all-boys boarding school orphanage, operated by the Caritas Internationalis.

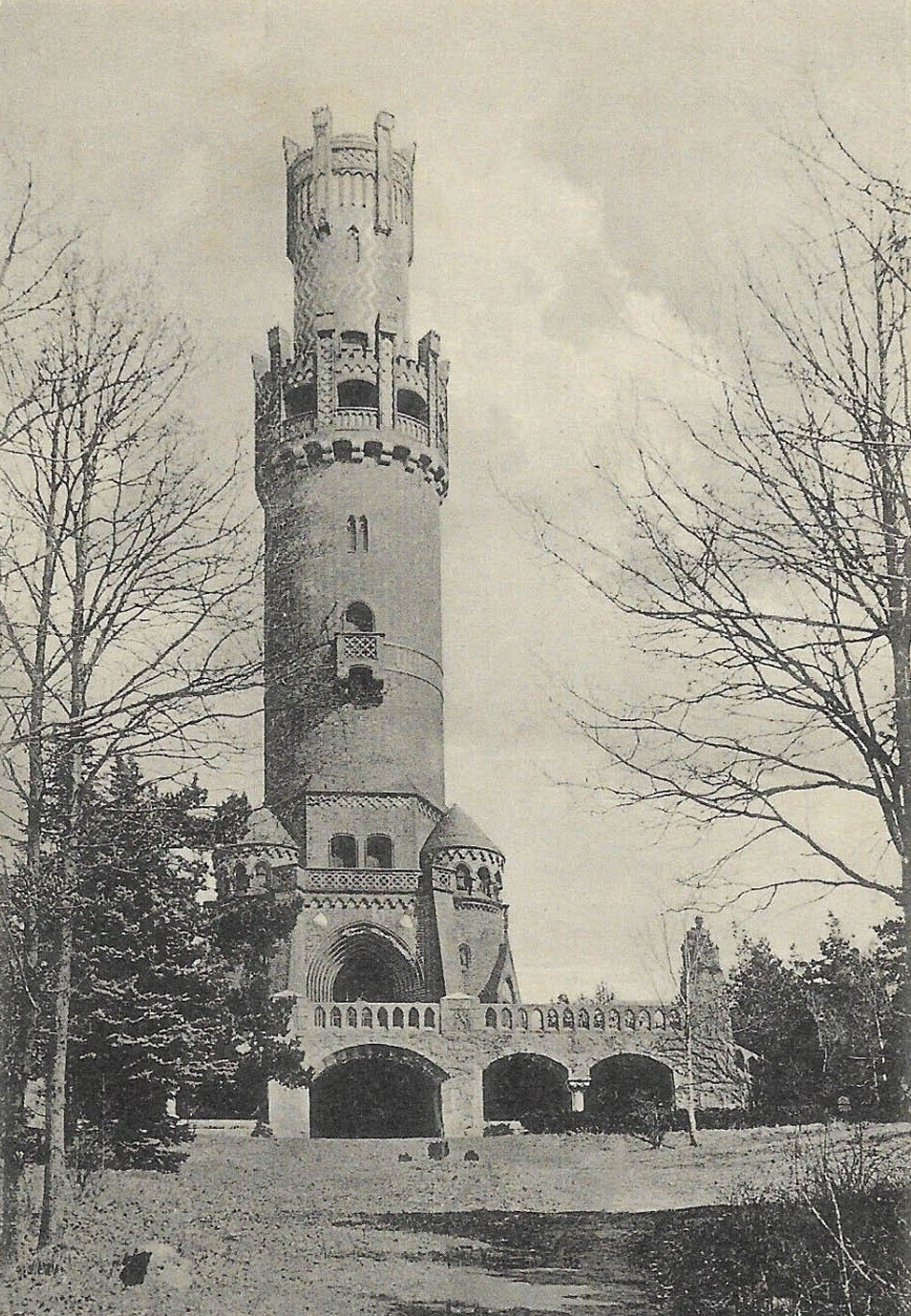
The Quistorp Tower, built in 1904, and demolished between 1944 and 1945.

Between 1900 and 1904, the Quistorp Tower, which served as an observation deck, was built to the southwest of Osów, on top of the Arkona Hill within the Arkona Woods. It was financed by businessman Martin Quistorp in commemoration of his father, Johannes Quistorp, an businessman and philanthropists, who founded numerous projects in the city. The surrounding area was developed into a park and hiking spot. The building had the total height of 52 m, and featured a coffeehouse at the first floor. It was designed in the Gothic Revival style by Franz Heinrich Schwechten, one of the most famous architects of the Wilhelmine era in Germany. In 1942, during the Second World War, the tower was used as a radar station and an observation post of the anti-aircraft defense. The building was destroyed in the 1940s. The exact circumstances remain uncertain, though, it is theorised that it was either destroyed in 1944 during an Allied bombing, or was destroyed in a planned explosion by the German officers, as it would form a noticeable reference point for the Soviet artillery.

In the 1930s, a suburb of single-family detached homes was developed to the south of Osów. Until 1933, the village had a sports club and a shooting sports association. Osów also had a volunteer fire department. The village was incorporated into the city of Szczecin on 15 October 1939. At the time, it had 938 residents. Previously, a southern portion of the modern neighbourhood was incorporated into the city in 1911, including the Steinfurth Mill, and a part of the Arkona Woods.

In 1931, an outdoor swimming pool complex was built in place of the Martin Lake, which was in the process of drying out. It was one of the largest recreational complexes in the city, featuring several swimming pools, sports pitches, and a food area. The swimming pools used the water from the Oswóka stream. In 1945, it was renamed to Świtezianka, and in 1947, to Arkonka. After the complex begun deteriorating, it was renovated in the 1960s, and reopened in 1966, featuring new swimming pools. The complex was again fully redeveloped between 2012 and 2014, becoming one of the largest outdoor swimming pool complexes in Europe, with the total area of 7 ha, and combined swimming area of 8,012 m^{2}.

Following the end of the Second World War in 1945, the city of Szczecin was placed under Polish administration, with the German population either fleeing or being expelled from Szczecin and replaced with Polish settlers. After the war, the neighbourhood was renamed from its German name of Wussow, being known as Wąsów, and later Ossowo, before receiving its current name of Osów.

From 1955 to 1976, the neighbourhood, then known as Ossowo, formed one of the administrative subdivisions of the Pogodno district. In 1960, it had a population of 968 people. On 28 November 1990, the neighbourhood of Osów was founded as one of the administrative subdivisions of the West district, being governed by an elected neighbourhood council.

In the 1970s, the neighbourhood of Skarbówek was developed in the area of Chopina Street, between Osów and Niemierzyn. It featured summer houses, some of which were also used as permanent residences. Prior to the Second World War, its area was a bird reserve.

Between 1998 and 2004, the housing estate of Gubałówka was developed alongside Miodowa Street. It consists of nine three-storey apartment buildings, containing 100 apartments. It was followed by two housing estates of single-family detached and semi-detached homes, including Morena developed between 2004 and 2008 on Obłoków and Niebiańska Streets, and Osówka developed between 2011 and 2018 on Piotrowskiego, Koziego Wierchu, and Miodowa Streets.

== Characteristics ==
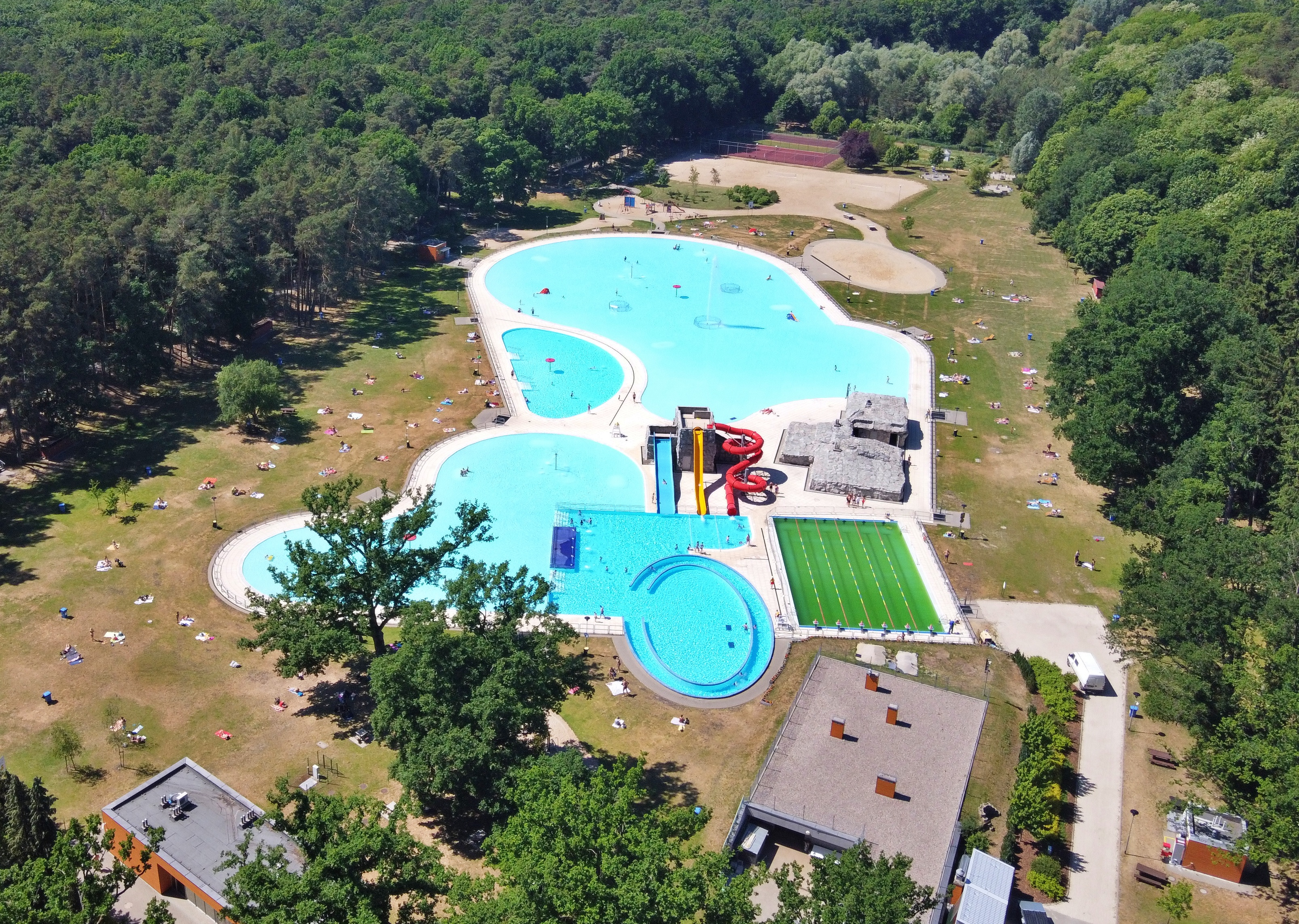
Arkonka, one of the largest outdoor swimming pool complexes in Europe.

Osów is a residential neighbourhood with low-rise single-family detached and semi-detached homes. The area also features three small low-rise housing estates. This includes Morena with buildings on Obłoków and Niebiańska Streets, and Osówka developed between 2011 and 2018 on Piotrowskiego, Koziego Wierchu, and Miodowa Streets. Both consists of single-family detached and semi-detached homes. Additionally, the housing estate of Gubałówka consists of nine three-storey apartment buildings on Miodowa Street. Furthermore, the area also includes the neighbourhood of Skarbówek, a small residential area with single-family detached homes and summer houses, located in the area of Chopina Street.

Osów features the Church of Our Lady of Sorrows, a Roman Catholic parish church dating to the year 1900, placed at 47 Miodowa Street. It also includes Arkonka, one of the largest outdoor swimming pool complexes in Europe, with the total area of 7 ha, and combined swimming area of 8,012 m^{2}. It is located at 30A Arkońska Street. Osów also features Szczecińska Gubałówka, a sports complex with two artificially snowed ski slopes, and an ice rink.

The majority of the neighbourhood is placed on Warszewo Hills, including Arkona Hill and Kupala Night Hill, with the heights of 70.3 m and 70 m, respectively. Around ⅔ of its area is covered by the Arkona Forest Park, which forms a part of the Ueckermünde Heath. In the north, the area is crossed by several streams, including Arkonka, Bystry Potok, Jasmundzka Struga, Kijanka, Krzewina, Osówka, Warszewiec, Warszówka, Żabiniec, and Zielonka. It also includes ponds such as Bright Pond, Quiet Pond, Upper Pond, and Wyszyna. The area alongside Osówka stream is known as the Seven Mills Valley, after seven gristmills which were present alongside it between 13th and 20th centuries.

The Arkona Forest Park also features the ruins of the Quistorp Tower, a Gothic Revival tower with observation deck placed on Arkona Hill, which was built in 1904, and demolished between 1944 and 1945. Additionally, it also includes the St. Brother Albert Youth Sociotherapy Center, a Roman Catholic all-boys boarding school orphanage, operated by the Caritas Internationalis. The Arkona Forest Park is also used by the believers of the Slavic Native Faith to host the religious ceremonies and rituals, such as Dożynki, the Forefathers, and the Kupala Night.

== Demographics ==
Historical population
Year	2008	2009	2010	2011	2012	2013	2014	2015	2016	2017	2018	2019	2020	2021	2022	2023	2024	2025
Pop.	2,829	3,087	3,271	3,413	3,558	3,680	3,795	3,857	3,941	4,088	4,267	4,386	4,500	4,635	4,781	4,884	4,959	5,105
±%	—	+9.1%	+6.0%	+4.3%	+4.2%	+3.4%	+3.1%	+1.6%	+2.2%	+3.7%	+4.4%	+2.8%	+2.6%	+3.0%	+3.1%	+2.2%	+1.5%	+2.9%

== Government and boundaries ==
Osów is one of the administrative neighbourhoods forming a subdivision of the West district in the city of Szczecin, Poland. It is governed by a locally elected neighbourhood council with 15 members. Its headquarters are located at 36A Miodowa Street. Its boundaries are approximately determined by Podburzańska Street, Miodowa Street, Karkonoska Street, Widokowa Street, Andersensa Street, Północna Street, Warszewiec stream, Fryderyka Chopina, Arkona Forest Park, Wojciechowskiego Street, Arkońska Street, Polish Armed Forces Avenue, and partially also by the boundaries with the neighbourhoods of Głębokie-Pilchowo to the west, and Warszewo to the west, as well as the city border to the north. Osów borders the neighbourhoods of Arkońskie-Niemierzyn, Głębokie-Pilchowo, Warszewo, and Zawadzkiego-Klonowica, and the municipality of Police in Police County. The neighbourhood has the total area of 8.14 km^{2} (3.14 sq mi).
