= Arkana =

Arkana may refer to:

- Arkana, Louisiana, a community in the United States
- Arkana, Baxter County, Arkansas, a community in the United States
- Arkana Publishing, a publishing imprint of Penguin Group of mainly esoteric books
- Keny Arkana, a French rap artist
- Arkana, a character in the French animated TV series Spartakus and the Sun Beneath the Sea
- Arkana, a character from the anime Yu-Gi-Oh!
- Arkana, a furniture manufacturer of the Eames era
- Arkayna, a main character from the new Nickelodeon show Mysticons. She is a princess, and leader of the Mysticons, where she is called Dragon Mage.
- Arkana, an online literary magazine published by the Arkansas Writers MFA Program at the University of Central Arkansas
- Renault Arkana, a sport utility vehicle model

== See also ==
- Arcana (disambiguation)
- Arkarna, an electronic music group
- Ark (disambiguation)
- Arkona (disambiguation)
