= Arkonka =

Water park in Szczecin, Poland

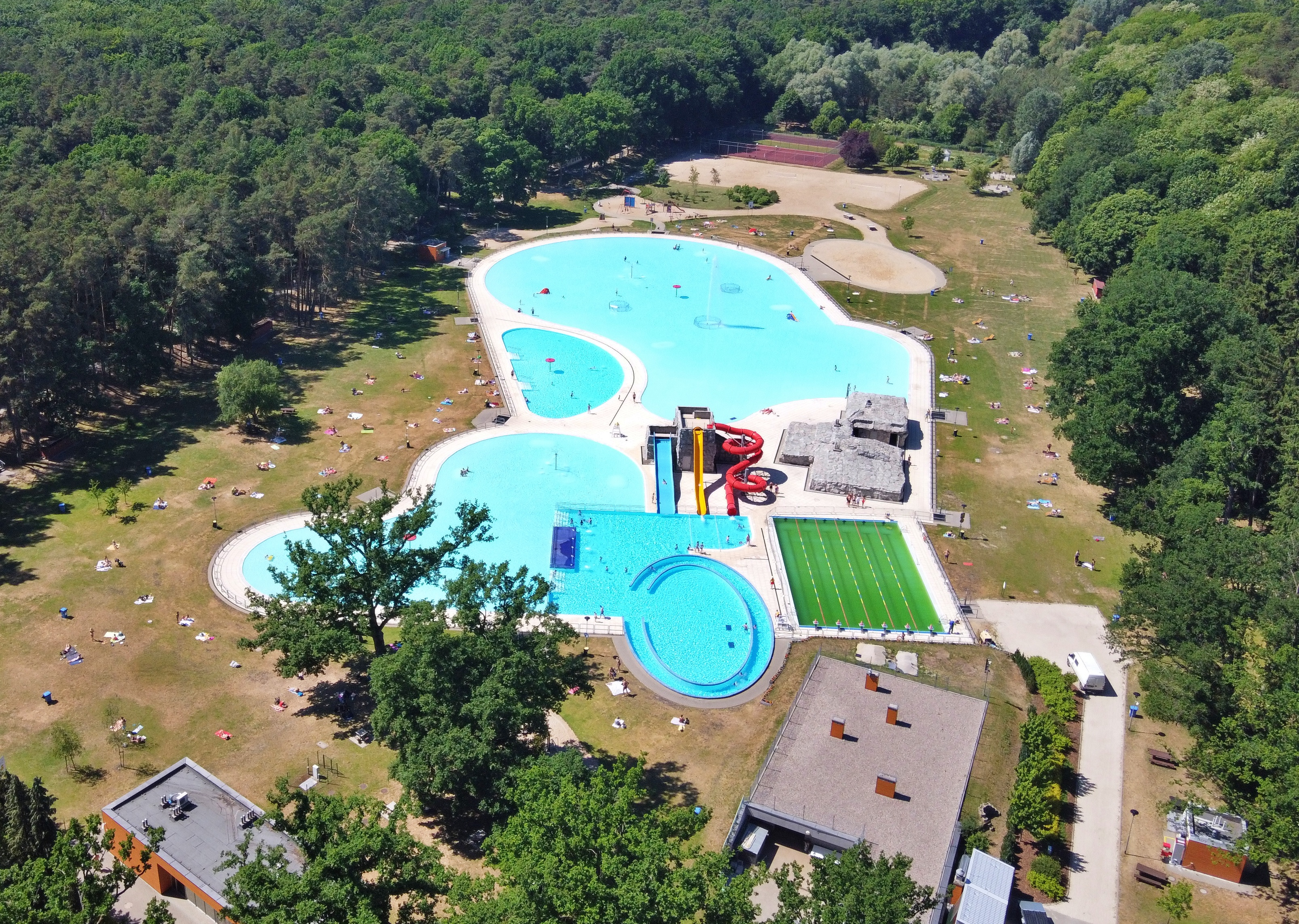
- The aerial view of the complex in 2021.
- Interactive map of Arkonka
- Location: 30A Arkońska Street, Osów, Szczecin, Poland
- Coordinates: 53°27′45.99″N 14°30′11.68″E
- Owner: Szczecin
- Opened: 27 June 2014
- Area: 7 ha
- Pools: 4 pools
- Water slides: 3 water slides
- Website: arkonka.szczecin.eu

The Arkonka Swimming Pool and Recreational Complex (Polish pronunciation: [arˈkɔŋ.ka]; Polish: Kompleks Basenowo-Rekreacyjny Arkonka), also known as the Arkonka Recreational Complex (Polish: Kompleks Rekreacyjny Arkonka), and simply as Arkonka, is an outdoor water park in Szczecin, Poland, located within the West district, as part of the Arkona Forest Park. It is placed at 30A Arkońska Street, within the administrative neighbourhood of Osów. The complex has an area of 7 ha, and includes four swimming pools, with the combined area of 8,012 m^{2}. It was opened on 27 June 2014. Previously, two different swimming complexes operated in its place, being opened in 1931 and 1966, respectively. They were built in place of the former Martin Lake.

== History ==
The area used to feature the Martin Lake (German: Martinsee), a small lake in the Arkona Woods, crossed by the Oswka stream. It had length of 220 m, and the width of 100 m. A gristmill named the Steinfurth Mill (German: Steinfurther Mühl; Polish: Młyn Steinfurtha) operated at the northern coast of the lake. Its was built as part of the farming estate of the village of Niemierzyn, with its oldest records dated to 1335. It was destroyed in 1677 during a siege in the Scanian War, and rebuilt afterwards. From 1808 to 1813, it was used as the barracks of the French Imperial Army, while the area was occupied during the Napoleonic Wars. The area was incorporated into the city in 1911. After 1945, the building was turned into a forester's lodge, named the Red Forester's Lodge (Polish: Czerwona Leśniczówka). It was deconstructed in the 1990s.

In 1931, an outdoor swimming pool complex was built in place of the lake, which was in the process of drying out. It continued to use the name Martin Lake, and was one of the largest recreational complexes in the city, featuring several swimming pools, sports pitches, and a food area. The swimming pools used the water from the Oswóka stream. In 1945, it was renamed to Świtezianka, after the 1822 ballad poem of the same name by Adam Mickiewicz. In it, the term świtezianka was a name for water nymph residing in the lake Sviciazʹ in Belarus. In 1947, it was again renamed to Arkonka, after the Arkona Forest Park, of which it was a part of. In turn, it was named after the Cape Arkona in Germany.

After the complex begun deteriorating, it was renovated in the 1960s, and reopened in 1966, featuring new swimming pools. The complex was again fully redeveloped between July 2012 and June 2014. It was opened on 27 June 2014, becoming one of the largest outdoor swimming pool complexes in Europe, with a total area of 7 ha, and combined swimming area of 8,012 m^{2}. The construction cost 36.8 million Polish zloties. A collection of large steel letters, forming the name Arkonka, have been preserved from the previous swimming pool complex.

== Characteristics ==
The complex covers an area of 7 ha, located within the Arkona Forest Park, next to Arkońska Street. It features four swimming pools, and includes paddling pools, sports pool, and a lazy river. Their depth ranges from 40 to 180 m, and their area, from 400 to 4,990 m^{2}. Combined, they have the total area of 8,012 m^{2}, and the total volume of 3,810 m^{3}. It also features a 15-metre-tall fountain, and three water slides, with the total length of 87 m. The largest slide has the length of 52.5 m the height of 5.5 m. The complex also features a skatepark, volleyball pitches, a tennis court, and an artificial sand beach. During the winter season, the skatepark is turned into an ice rink with an area of 1,000 m^{2}. The complex has a maximal capacity of 5,000 guests. It is owned by the city of Szczecin.
