= Skarbówek =

Neighbourhood of Szczecin, Poland

- Neighbourhood
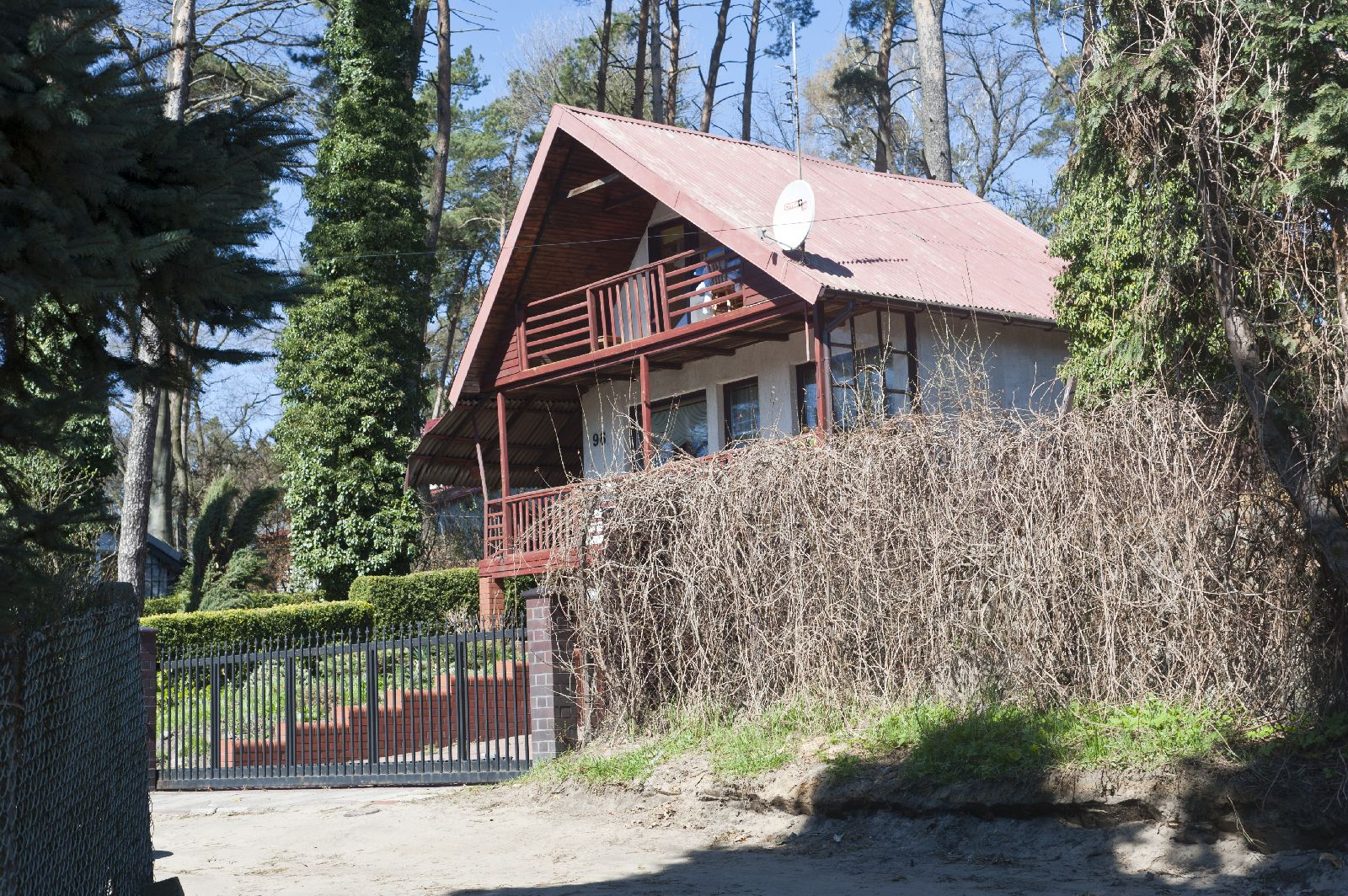
- A house in Skarbówek.
- Interactive map of Skarbówek
- Coordinates: 53.46466°N 14.52459°E
- Country: Poland
- Voivodeship: West Pomeranian
- City and county: Szczecin
- District: West
- Administrative neighbourhood: Osów
- Time zone: UTC+1 (CET)
  - Summer (DST): UTC+2 (CEST)
- Area code: +48 91
- Car plates: ZS

Skarbówek (Polish: [skarˈbu.vɛk]) is a small neighbourhood of Szczecin, Poland, located within the West district, in the administrative subdivision of Osów. It is a low-rise residencial area on Chopina Street, with single-family detached homes and summer houses. The neighbourhood was developed in the 1970s.

== History ==
Prior to the Second World War, the area of the modern neighbourhood was a bird reserve. In the 1970s, the area of Chopina Street, between Osów and Niemierzyn, was developed with summer houses, some of which were also used as permanent residences. It was originally known as Skarbówka (Polish: [skarˈbuf.ka]), and later as Skarbówek.

== Characteristics ==
Skarbówek is a small residential neighbourhood, located in the area of Chopina Street. It is a low-rise area, with single-family detached houses and summer houses. To the west and south, it borders the Arkona Forest Park, and to the north, east, it is surrounded by the allotments. It is located in the southern portion of the administrative neighbourhood of Osów.
