= Arkona =

Arkona may refer to:

- Cape Arkona on the German island of Rügen
- Arkona (band), a Russian folk metal band
- Arkona, Ontario
- Arkona, (1985-2002) a cruise ship
- ARKONA (FüWES), an Air Command and Control System (ACCS), used by the German air force
- Arkona (2004), one of the icebreakers of Germany
- Arkona Hill, a hill in Szczecin, Poland
- Lake Arkona, a stage of the lake waters in the Huron-Erie-Ontario basin
- Arkona Forest Park, a forest in Szczecin, Poland

== See also ==
- Arkońskie-Niemierzyn, a neighbourhood in Szczecin, Poland
