= Arcanum =

Arcanum may refer to:

== Music ==
- Arcanum (album), a 1996 album by Acoustic Alchemy
- The Arcanum (album), a 2000 album by Suidakra
- Arcanum, a piece of music by Ezequiel Viñao
- Arcanum, song off the album Dog Whistle by Show Me the Body
- Arckanum, a black metal band

== Other uses ==
- Arcanum: Of Steamworks and Magick Obscura, a 2001 computer role-playing game
- Arcanum, Ohio, a village in the United States
- Arcanum (company), a Hungarian mass digitization company
- Arcanum (encyclical), a 1880 Catholic encyclical letter
- Arcanum (comics), an American comic book published by Image Comics
- The Arcanum (Atlantis), a 1984 book for the role-playing game Atlantean Trilogy later known as Atlantis
- The Arcanum (novel), a 2005 novel by Thomas Wheeler
- The Arcanum (non fiction), a 1998 non-fiction book on the history of porcelain
- Arcanum, a Conex Research-proposed space probe in the exploration of Neptune
- The Grand Arcanum, the secret of the philosopher's stone in alchemy

== See also ==
- Arcandam
- Arcana (disambiguation)
- Arcane (disambiguation)
