= Arcane =

Arcane may refer to:

== Comics and literature ==
- Anton Arcane, a DC Comics character
- Arcane Jill Watson, a fictional character in The Hitchhiker's Guide to the Galaxy franchise
- Arcane literature, fictional literature in the Cthulhu Mythos

== Gaming ==
- Arcane magic (Dungeons & Dragons), a type of magic in the Dungeons & Dragons role-playing game
  - Complete Arcane, a rulebook for the Dungeons & Dragons role-playing game
  - Arcane Archer, a character class in the Dungeons & Dragons role-playing game
  - Arcane Trickster, a character class in the Dungeons & Dragons role-playing game

== Music ==
- Arcane (album), a 1987 album by Cindy Blackman
- "The Arcane", a song by Dead Can Dance from the 1984 EP Garden of the Arcane Delights

== Other uses ==
- Arcane, a British magazine published by Future plc
- Arcane (TV series), a French-American animated television series in the League of Legends universe

== See also ==
- Arcan (disambiguation)
- Arcana (disambiguation)
- Arcanum (disambiguation)
