= Arcana =

Arcana may refer to:

== Games ==
- Arcana (video game), a 1992 card-themed role-playing game
- Arcanacon, an Australian role-playing game convention
- Arcana Studio, a comic book company
- Major Arcana, the trumps of Tarot cards
- Minor Arcana, the numbered pip Tarot cards
- Knowledge (Arcana), a skill in the tabletop role-playing game Dungeons & Dragons

== Music ==
- Arcana (American band), an American jazz band
- Arcana (Swedish band), a Swedish dark wave band
- Arcana (record label), a French classical record label
- Arcana (album), a 2001 album by Edenbridge
- Arcana (Varèse), a classical composition by Edgard Varèse

== Other uses ==
- Arcana Bar and Lounge, a lesbian bar in North Carolina
- Arcana (convention), a Minnesota dark fantasy/horror convention
- Arcana (film), a 1972 Italian horror-drama film
- Arcana (manga), a 2000 manga series by Yua Kotegawa
- Arcana, a collection of poems by A. W. Yrjänä
- Cure Arcana, a character in Star Detective Precure!

== See also ==
- Arcanna, a superheroine in Marvel Comics
- Arkana (disambiguation)
- Arcane (disambiguation)
- Arcanum (disambiguation)
