= Arkona Hill =

Hill in Szczecin, Poland

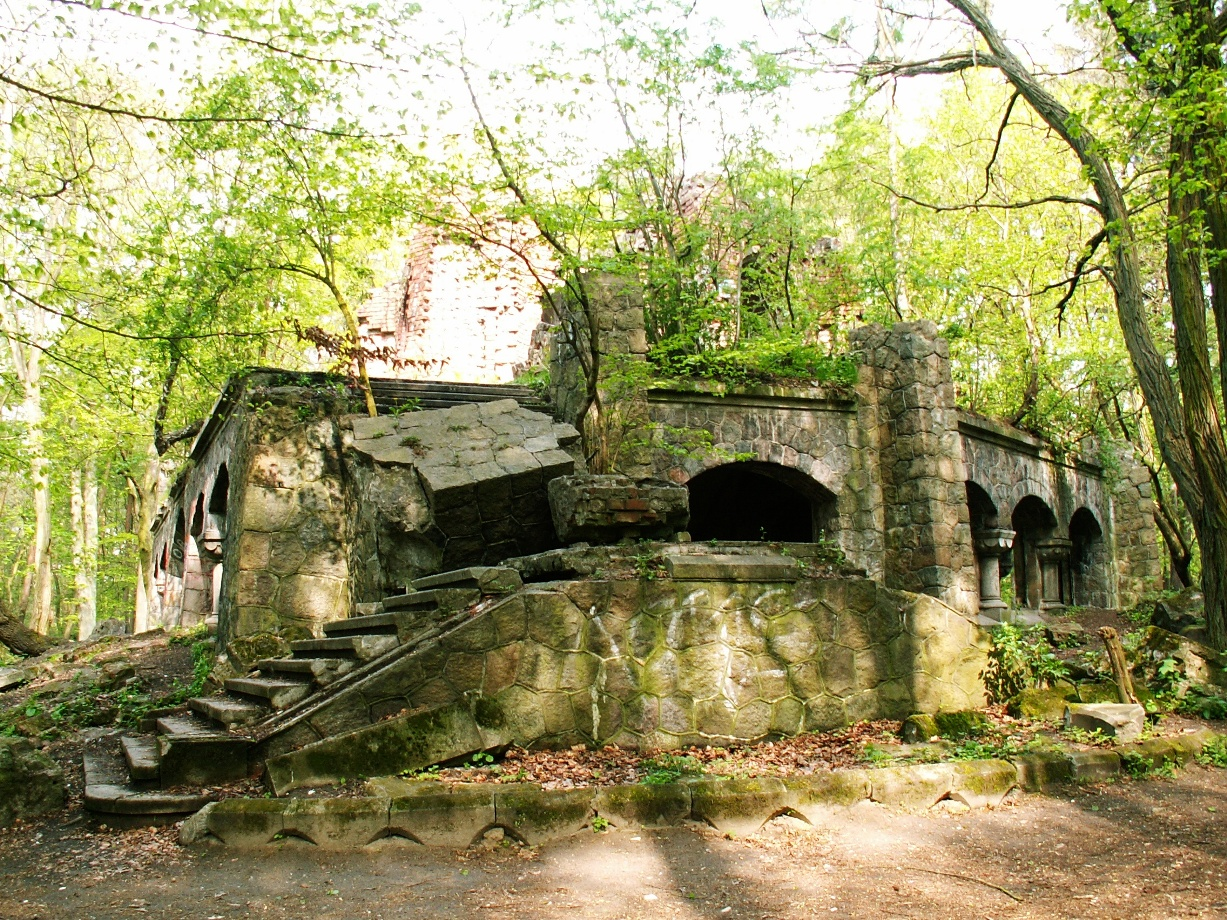
- The ruins of the Quistorp Tower, at the top of the Arkona Hill.

Highest point
- Elevation: 70 m (230 ft)
- Coordinates: 53°27′52″N 14°30′57″E

Geography
- Country: Poland
- Voivodeship: West Pomeranian Voivodeship
- City: Szczecin

Arkona Hill (Polish: Wzgórze Arkony; German: Arkona-Hügel), previously known as Qusitorp Hill (German: Qusitorp-Hügel; Polish: Wzgórze Qusitorpa), and Eckerberg Hill (German: Eckerberg-Hügel), is a hill in the city of Szczecin, Poland, located within the neighbourhood of Osów. It forms a part of the Warszewo Hills, and is placed within the Arkona Forest Park. Its height messures is 70.3 m (230.64 ft.).

== History ==
Between 1899 and 1904, on the hill was built the Qusitorp Tower, a 52-meter-tall (170.6 ft.) tower which included a coffeehouse at its base, and a viewing point on top. The building was destroyed between 1944 and 1945, during the Second World War. Currently, its ruins remain there.
