= Arkana, Louisiana =

Unincorporated community in Louisiana, U.S.

- ghost town
- Location within Louisiana Location within the United States
- Country: United States
- State: Louisiana
- Parish: Bossier
- Elevation: 244 ft (74 m)
- Time zone: UTC-6 (Central (CST))
  - Summer (DST): UTC-5 (CDT)
- Area code: 318
- GNIS feature ID: 541047

Arkana is a former town that crossed the state lines between Louisiana and Arkansas in the United States, although mostly lying in the latter state.

In the 1890s, Arkana was described as a new railroad town, and was later the site of a rail station, lumber mill, church, post office, and school. The community was also the site of the Arkana and Eastern Railroad Company, a rail line which operated between Arkana and Springhill in the early 20th century.

Arkana was named "ark-" plus "-ana" from "Louisiana" and "Arkansas".

== Early years ==
One of the early settlers of Arkana was Jackson Clark Byram, who established a homestead in 1848. He was the veteran of three wars and had a large family.

Arkana was originally a rail station on the Cotton Belt Route (the St. Louis Southwestern Railway), a major railroad connecting the US states of Missouri, Arkansas, Tennessee, Louisiana, and Texas. A sawmill owned by the Arkana Lumber Company operated in Arkana until 1899, when it burned, at a loss of $45,000. This was one of several sawmill fires in Arkana; an earlier fire had occurred in 1892.

By the 1890s, a history of northwestern Louisiana called Arkana "a new railroad town", and in 1912, the Bossier City Banner described Arkana as a "place and community". The population of Arkana was 12 in 1900.

== 20th century ==
A tract of 4,000 acres was platted for the Arkana townsite in 1915, with plans for small parcels to be sold to settlers. An ad for 100 town lots in Arkana ran in the Bossier Banner around that time. The Arkana townsite was developed by the Cotton Belt Land and Development Company, headquartered in Indianapolis, Indiana.

Arkana was soon home to several stores, a church, and a post office.

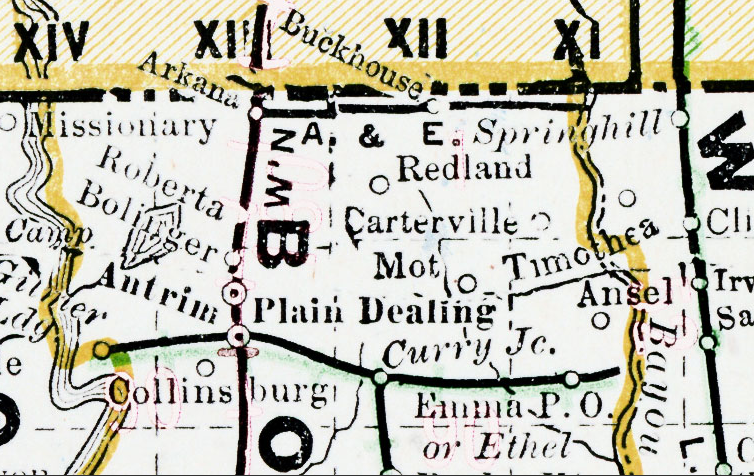
Arkana in northern Bossier Parish, Louisiana, in 1907

Arkana was also the site of the Arkana and Eastern Railroad Company, a short rail line which operated between the communities of Arkana and Springhill in the late 19th and early 20th century.

The Burton Lumber Company operated a lumber mill in Arkana during the 1920s and 1930s. Portions of the Burton Mill caught fire on five occasions in 1922.

Circa 1920, the community of Arkana was the site of the Arkana School. The population of Arkana in 1920 was 63.

In April 1936, Louisiana Highway 10 (now Louisiana Highway 3) between Arkana and Plain Dealing was completed. It was reported that "Arkana will have a good road leading both north and south."

Arkana's population in 1940 was 63. In 1952, The Plain Dealing Progress reported that the hard surface road between Hope, Arkansas, and Arkana had been extended.

In 1980, it was reported that the Crystal Oil and Land Company was pumping over 2 million cubic feet of gas per day from a site 0.5 miles (0.80 km) southwest of what had become known as "the old Arkana townsite."

== See also ==
- Bellevue, Bossier Parish, Louisiana
