= The Arcanum (Gleeson book) =

The Arcanum: The Extraordinary True Story
- Author: Janet Gleeson
- Language: English
- Subject: History of Ceramics
- Publisher: Warner Books; Grand Central Publishing
- Publication date: 1998
- Media type: Print (Hardcover & Paperback)
- Pages: 324pp 336pp
- ISBN: 0-593-04348-0
- Dewey Decimal: 738.092243214

The Arcanum is a 1998 book by Janet Gleeson telling the story of the invention of European porcelain and the start of the porcelain industry outside China and Japan.

The book details the events leading to the discovery of the formula for porcelain (the intended meaning of the book title), the ensuing start of the porcelain industry in Meissen, and its rapid spread to other places in Europe in the 18th century. The characters of the plot are:

- Augustus, 1670-1733, (king of Poland as Augustus II the Strong, Elector of Saxony as Friedrich Augustus I, Grand Duke of Lithuania as Augustas II), who is desperate for a way to finance his spending and has hopes on the wonders of alchemy.
- Johann Friedrich Böttger, 1682-1719, the teenage alchemist who gets imprisoned and forced, given the materials required, to come up with a reliable way to produce gold and who tries hard but ends up changing direction toward the search to find a commercially viable formula for porcelain, which in this period was more valuable than gold. Assisting Ehrenfried Walther von Tschirnhaus, a scientist who has already been experimenting with ways to make porcelain, their approach, an attempt to bake clay at higher temperatures than had ever before been attained in European kilns, yielded the breakthrough that had eluded European potters for a century.
- David Köhler, who learned porcelainmaking while assisting Böttger, and developed the first enamel colors for Meissen porcelain.
- Samuel Stölzel, who learned porcelainmaking while assisting Böttger, escaped and helped start a rival porcelain factory in Vienna, recruited Herold, repented, returned with Herold and developed the enamel colors further.
- Johan Gregor Herold, an ambitious artist, who developed the colors and patterns to decorate the early European porcelain.
- Johann Joachim Kaendler, 1706 – 1775, a virtuoso sculptor/modeler who used the new material, porcelain, to invent an artform.
- Dutch Palace, containing King Augustus' precious porcelain collection.
- Meissen, German town near Dresden, with a castle (Albrechtsburg) where Böttger was locked up, which was later turned into a porcelain factory.
