= Arkona Forest Park =

Park in Szczecin, Poland

Coordinates: 53°28′10″N 14°30′20″E

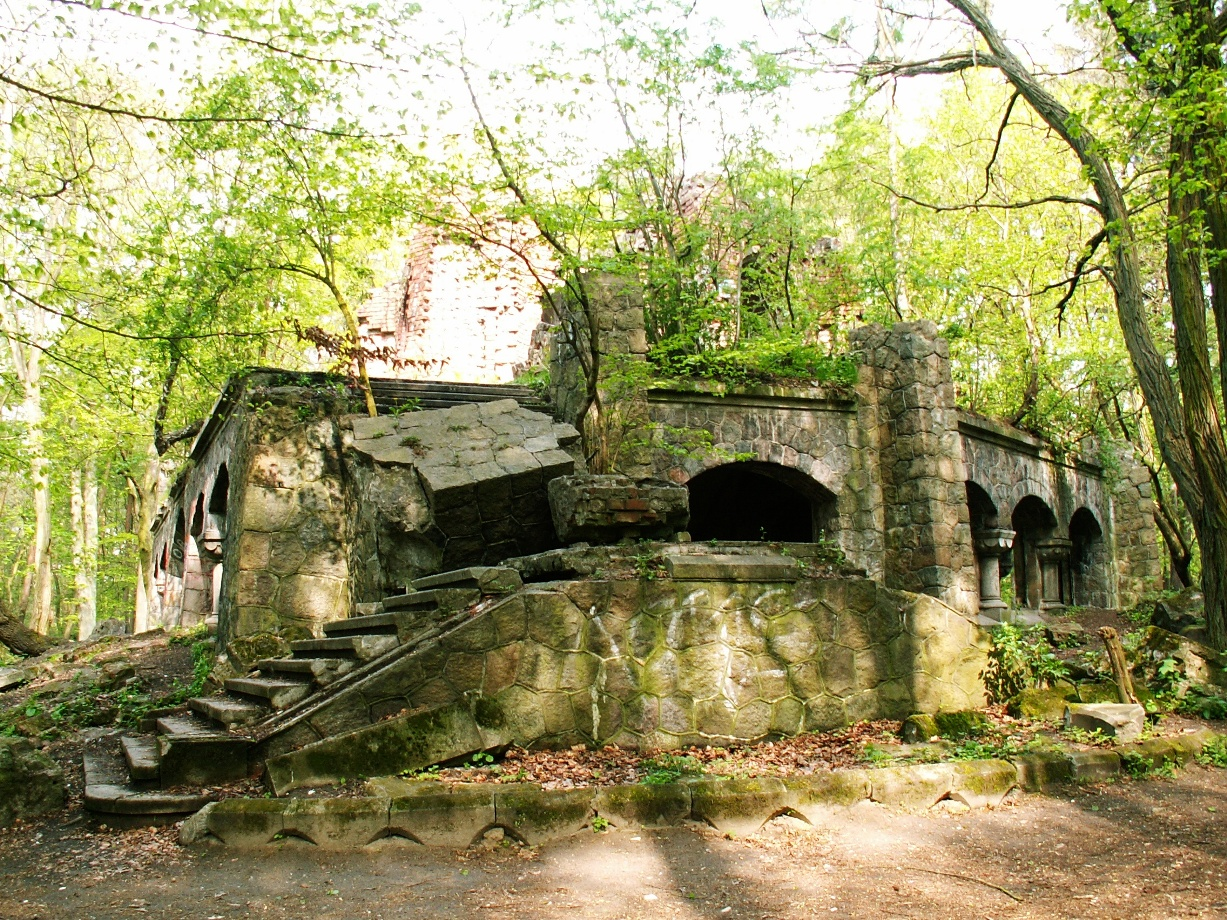
- The ruins of the Quistorp Tower in the Arkona Forest Park

- Location within Poland

Geography
- Location: Szczecin, West Pomeranian Voivodeship, Poland
- Area: 976.9 ha (2,414 acres)

Administration
- Status: Forest park

The Arkona Forest Park (Polish: Park Leśny Arkoński, Uroczysko Las Arkoński) also simply known as the Arkona Woods (Polish: Las Arkoński, Lasek Arkoński), and until 1945, as the Eckerberg Woods (German: Eckerberger Wald), is a forest in the city of Szczecin, Poland, that is a part of the Szczecin Forests, which by themselves, are a part of the Ueckermünde Heath. It is located in the Warszewo Hills, in the north-western part of the city, in the municipal neighbourhoods of Arkońskie-Niemierzyn, Głębokie-Pilchowo, and Osów. It covers an area of 976.9 ha.

== Name ==
The name of Arkona Forest (Polish: Las Arkoński) refers to the Cape Arkona, located at the island of Rügen in Germany, place of worship of Svetovit, god in Slavic paganism. Prior to 1945, it was called Eckerberg Forrest (German: Eckerberger Wald), known after the estate of Eckerberg located in the area, which itself was named after the regional hill.

== Characteristics ==
In the area is covered by the mixed forest, with tree species that include: pinus sylvestris, fagus sylvatica, Scots pine, European beech, silver birch, common alder, as well as the oak and poplar trees. There are also various introduced species of trees such as European larch, and Douglas fir.

The park is located in the Warszewo Hills, and includes Arkona Hill (70.3 m), and Sobótka Hill (c. 70 m). Across the area flow several creeks, such as: Arkonka, Kijanka, Osówka, Żabiniec, Zielonka, and others. It also include a few lakes and ponds such as: Cichy Staw, Głuszec, Goplana Lake, Górny Staw, Mermaid Ponds. Historically, there was also lake Świtezianka, which eventually dried out, and was built over by the Arkonka swimming pool complex.

== Attractions ==
In the park is located several sports, relaxation and recitational buildings. It include several tourist scenic routes, viewpointss, a luge track, and a ski lift. In the park is also located a Arkonka swimming pool complex, and the Arkonia Szczecin Stadion. On the Arkona Hill are located the ruins of the Quistorp Tower.

== Culture ==
The forest is important religious place for the practitioners of Slavic Native Faith, with Rodzima Wiara religious organization organizing there several religious celebrations, including Yarilo Celebrations, Kupala Night, harvest festival, Forefathers' Eve, and koliada. The name of the forest itself refers to the Cape Arkona, located at the island of Rügen in Germany, place of worship of Svetovit, god in Slavic paganism.
