= Siege of Stettin (1677) =

Siege during the Scanian War

- Part of the Scanian War
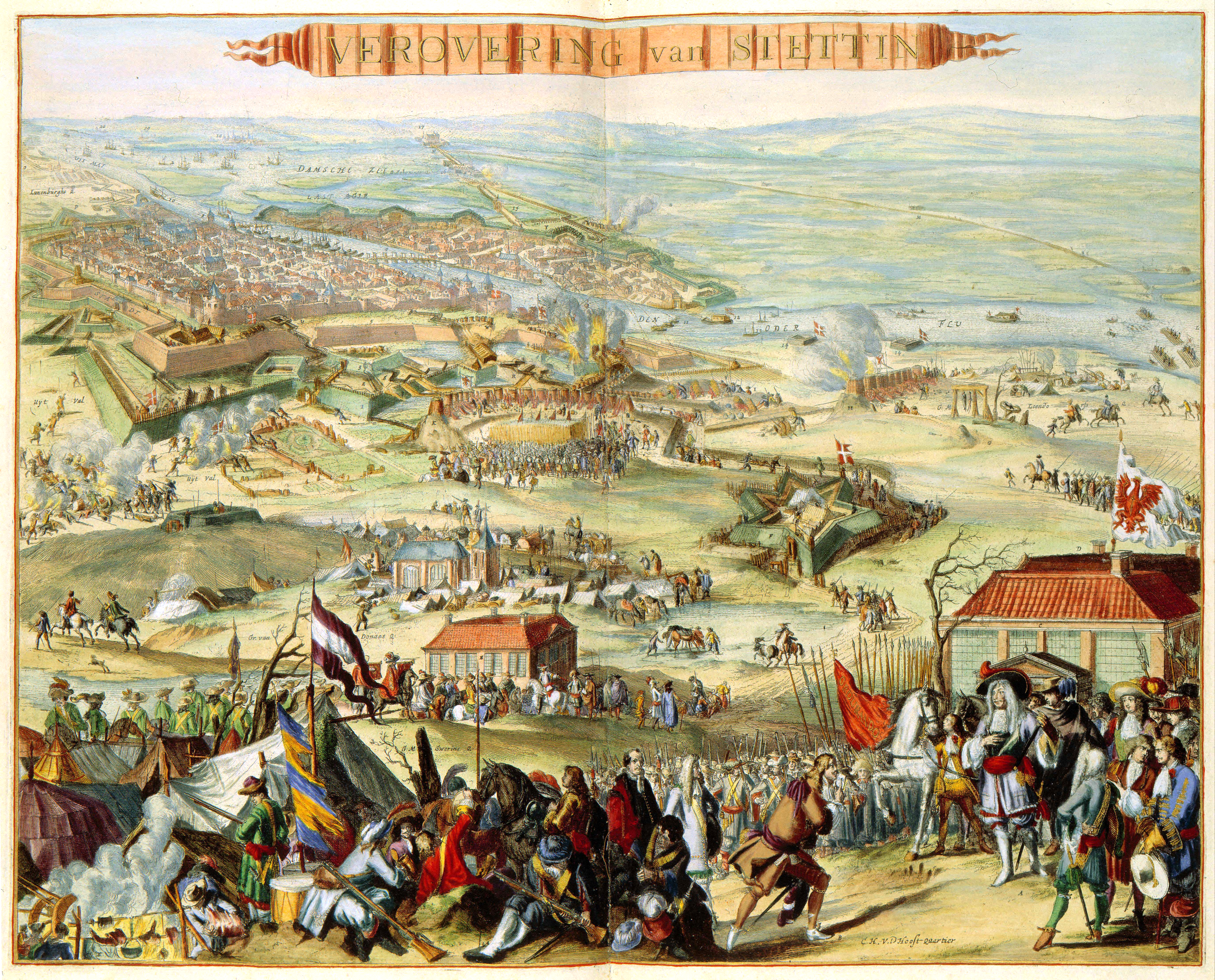
- Anonymous 17th-century depiction of the siege
Date	July – 26 December 1677
Location	Stettin (modern-day Szczecin, Poland), Swedish Pomerania 53°25′57″N 14°32′53″E
Result	Allied victory
Territorial changes	Stettin is conquered by the allied troops

Belligerents
(yes) Swedish Empire	Brandenburg; Denmark–Norway; Principality of Lüneburg

Commanders and leaders
(yes) Jacob Johann von Wulffen	Frederick William

Units involved
(yes) Stettin garrison	Lehnsdorff Regiment

Strength
2,000–3,000 men	20,000–22,200 men 110 guns 25 mortars

Casualties and losses
1,300–2,700 killed	4,289 killed 316 wounded
- 2,000 civilians killed

The siege of Stettin (Swedish: belägringen av Stettin; German: belagerung von Stettin; Polish: oblężenie Szczecina) occurred from July to 26 December 1677 during the Scanian War. It began when an allied army of Danes, Brandenburgian, and Lüneburgian, led by Frederick William of Brandenburg, consisting of 20,000–22,000 men, approached Stettin in July. The city's garrison, commanded by Jacob Johan von Wulffen, was some 2,000–3,000 men strong, reinforced by the burghers in the city.

In August, Frederick William began heavy bombardments of the city, trying in vain to break its spirits. After this failed, he besieged the city. On 10 December, the allies created a large opening in the city wall and began preparing for an assault. However, before the assault was finalized, the garrison capitulated in exchange for free departure.

== Background ==
On 4 April 1672, France and Sweden entered into an alliance primarily targeted towards the Dutch Republic. According to the treaty, Sweden was to intervene against the German princes who tried to support the Dutch in the event of a French attack. In return, Sweden received extensive subsidies and a guarantee that France would not support a Danish attack on Sweden.

Soon after signing the treaty, France declared war on the Dutch Republic. In 1674, Sweden intervened on the French side in the war by invading Brandenburg, which had entered the war in 1673.

=== Prelude ===
In 1676, Otto Wilhelm Königsmarck succeeded Carl Gustaf Wrangel and took command of Swedish troops in Pomerania.

In June of the same year, Frederick William continued invading Swedish Pomerania. With an army of 12,000 men, he captured Anklam and Demmin on 17 August and 30 September, respectively. He also besieged Stettin for a month, but gave up the attempt once winter began.

== Siege ==
Commanding an allied army of Brandenburgian, Danes, and Lüneburgian, Frederick William besieged Stettin once more in July 1677. The composition of the army, according to one source, was 18,000 Brandenburgian, 3,000 Lüneburgian, and 1,200 Danes, for a total of 22,000 men. However, other sources put the total size at 20,000. The allies also had 110 cannons and 25 mortars. In comparison, Stettin had a garrison of 2,000, 2,300, or 3,000 under the command of Jacob Johann von Wulffen. The garrison was reinforced by the city's burghers, who were loyal to the Swedes. In early August, Frederick William began bombarding the city in order to shatter resistance, causing fires to erupt in the city. However, von Wulffen did not give up, and Frederick William was forced to begin a lengthy siege. On 10 December, the besieging army successfully created an opening in the city wall and began preparing for an assault.

=== Capitulation ===
Before assaulting the wall, the allies first had to capture two sconces defending the city. After a night's rest, they moved towards one of them, storming and capturing it. The other one did not need to be captured, as its garrison had mutinied and handed it over to the allies. On 26 December, von Wulffen capitulated to the besieging army in exchange for free departure and a return to Sweden with the now 300–700 men strong garrison. Following the separation of Germans in Swedish service, the remaining garrison departed for Köslin on 1 January, when nearly 1,100 men had either fallen sick or died.

== Aftermath ==
After the capture of the city, Frederick William initially planned to make it Brandenburg's capital instead of Berlin. Subsequently, Frederick William proceeded to Berlin, and his army moved into winter quarters.

The siege also resulted in the deaths of around 4,000 Brandenburgian troops. Additionally, the Danish Lehnsdorff Regiment suffered 289 dead and 316 wounded. After his capitulation, von Wulffen was promoted to Lieutenant General and Stadtholder in Finland. During the siege, 2,000 citizens in the town had been killed.

== See also ==
- Siege of Wolgast – 1675 siege in Germany
- Siege of Stralsund (1678)
