= Forester's lodge =

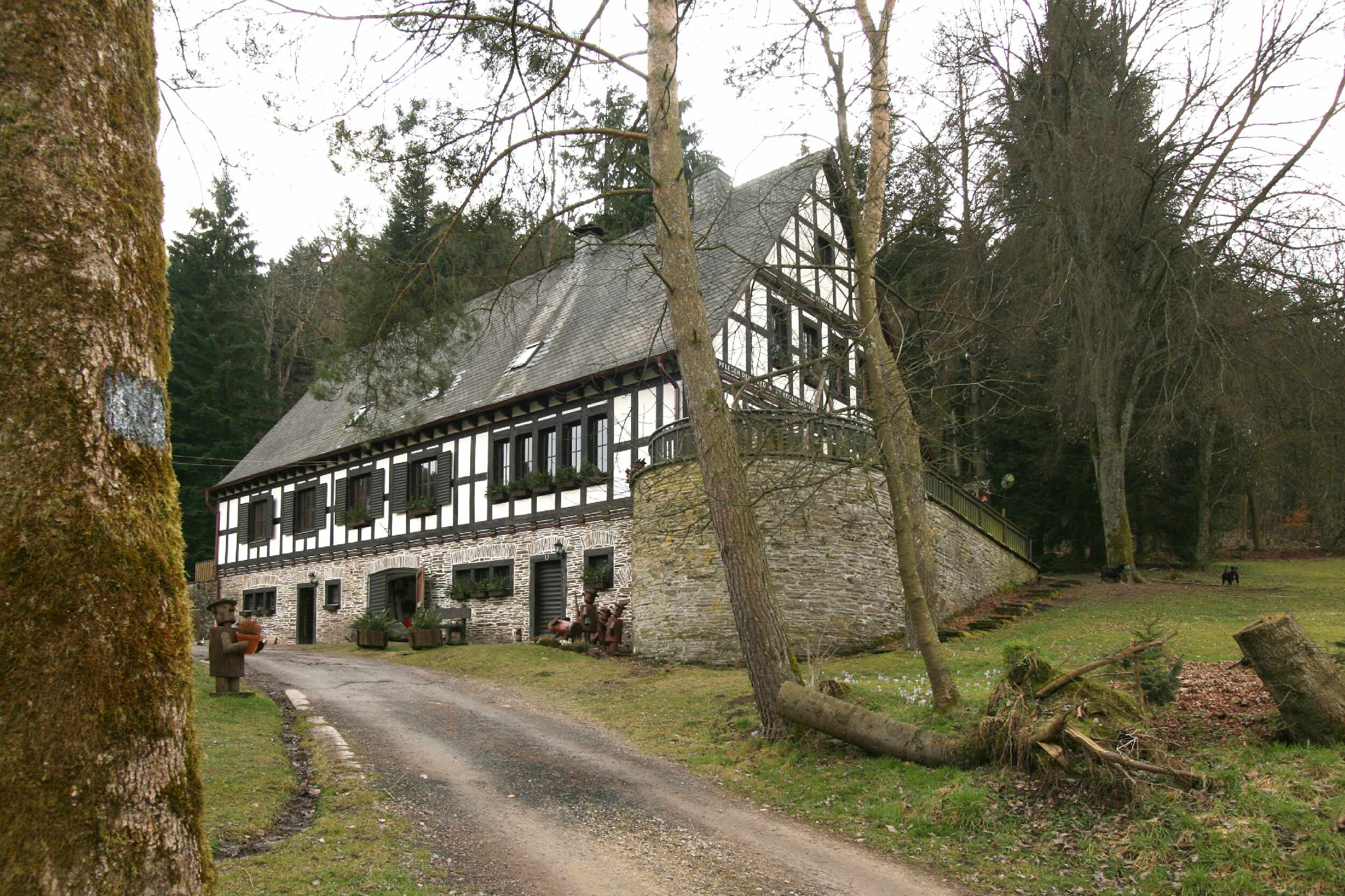
Dahm forester's lodge near Attendorn

A forester's lodge, forester's house or forester's hut is the residence of a forester, usually one who is in charge of a forest district.

== History ==
Woodcutters' huts are as old as forestry itself. To begin with, temporary accommodation was usually built for the clearing of areas of forest, but they became more permanent in the High Middle Ages in Europe as more and more timber was felled for mining, saltworks, shipbuilding and firewood, in order to reduce the distance from home to workplace. The foresters could remain in an area of timber felling for weeks. With the development of forestry rights, the profession of foresters emerged and so the forester's lodge became a place of work. In some cases, large forester's estates were created.

Usually forester's houses are solid, brick-built structures that are often permanently occupied, for example as forestry administrative offices, and usually in or near settlements, while forester's huts are less well built, simpler shelters and overnight accommodation in the more remote regions of a forest district. Even today, a forester's house and several forester's huts may be only temporarily constructed in a larger forest district, during forest management work. The development of forest tracks and logging lorries, however, has meant that overnighting on site is no longer necessary in Central Europe, but is still common in the large forests of northern Europe. Sometimes a combined site is used for hunting and forestry (in Germany referred to as a Hegerhaus).

== Architecture ==
Together with hunting lodges, alm huts and other transhumance stations, and mountain huts, forest lodge and huts are among the most important settlement forms of the sparsely populated areas such as large forests or highlands, where they are not located within settlements.

Forest houses in Europe have a certain architecture, that is both designed to be in keeping with the countryside and also to be recognisable for what they are . Thus they often occupy an exposed site. A stag's head is often placed above the entrance or on a gable.

Occasionally forester's houses have a defensive character. For example, the 1812 lodge of Schießhaus in the Solling was surrounded by a defensive wall with embrasures.

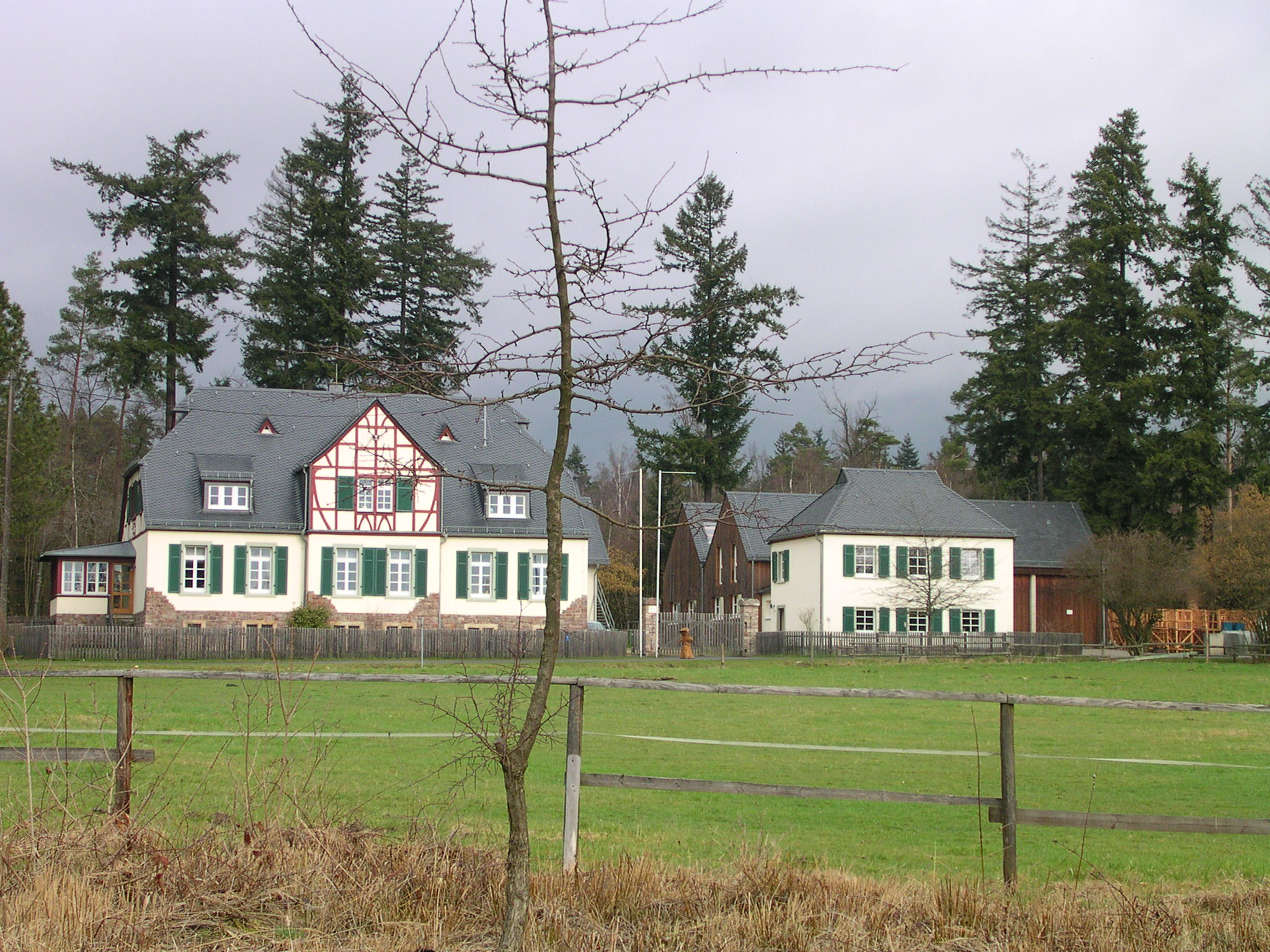
Forsthaus Entenpfuhl near Bad Sobernheim

Forester's lodge in the Flensburg Municipal Forest.

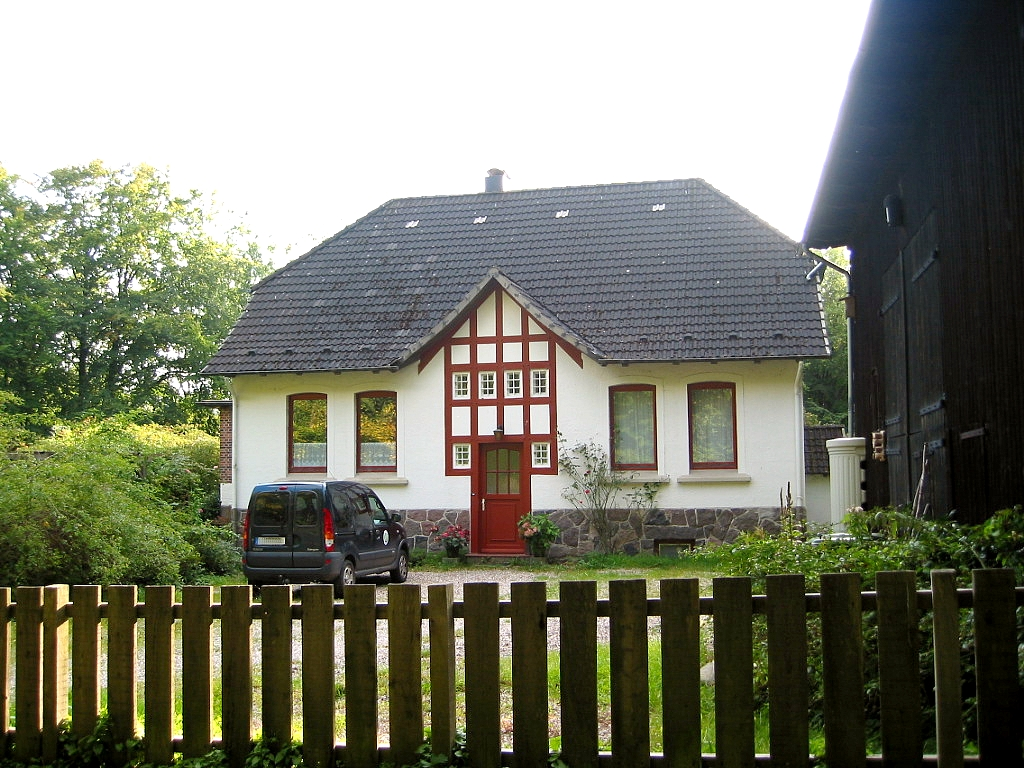
Forsthaus Glücksburg near Flensburg

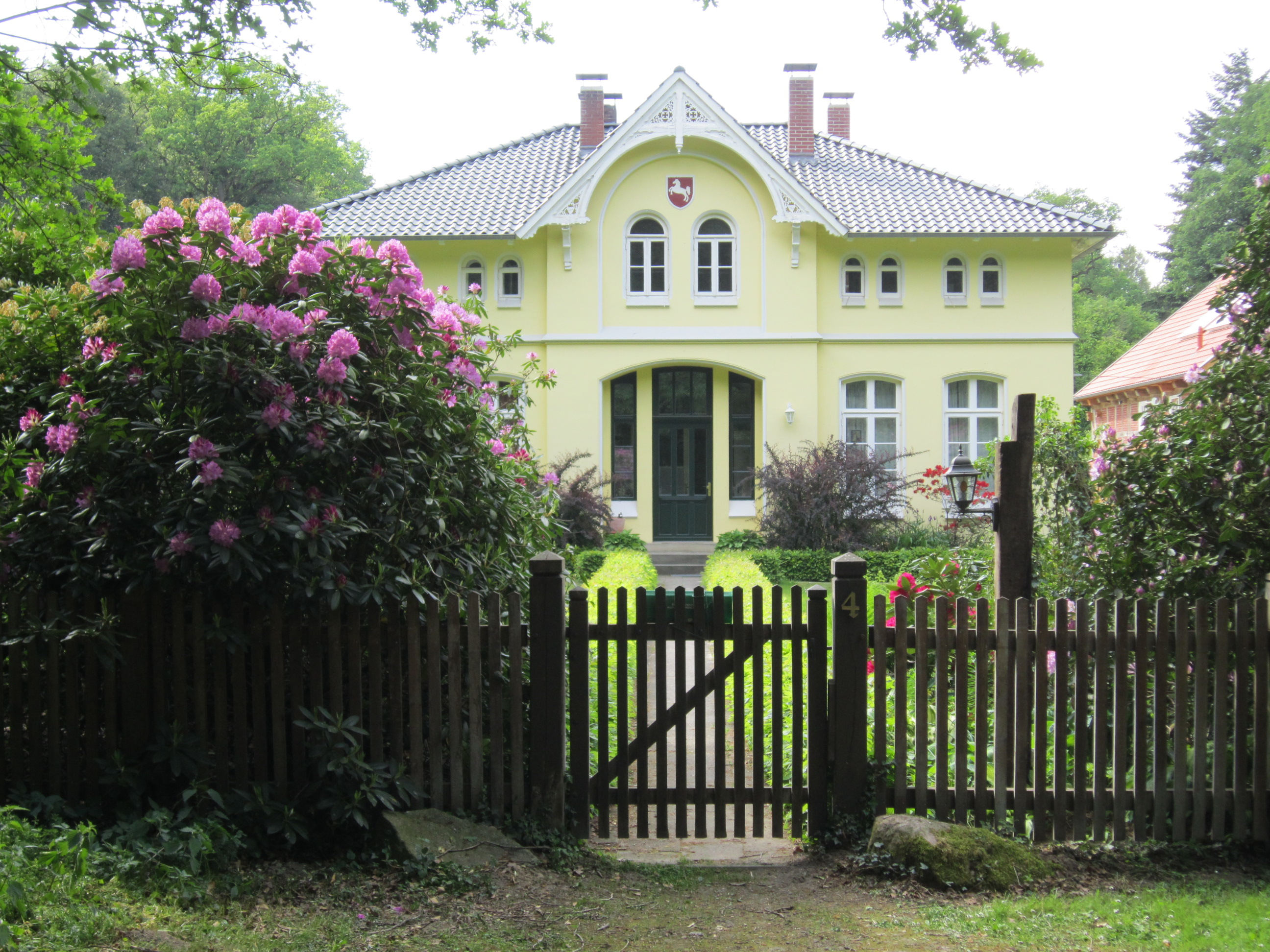
Lodge in Goldenstedt

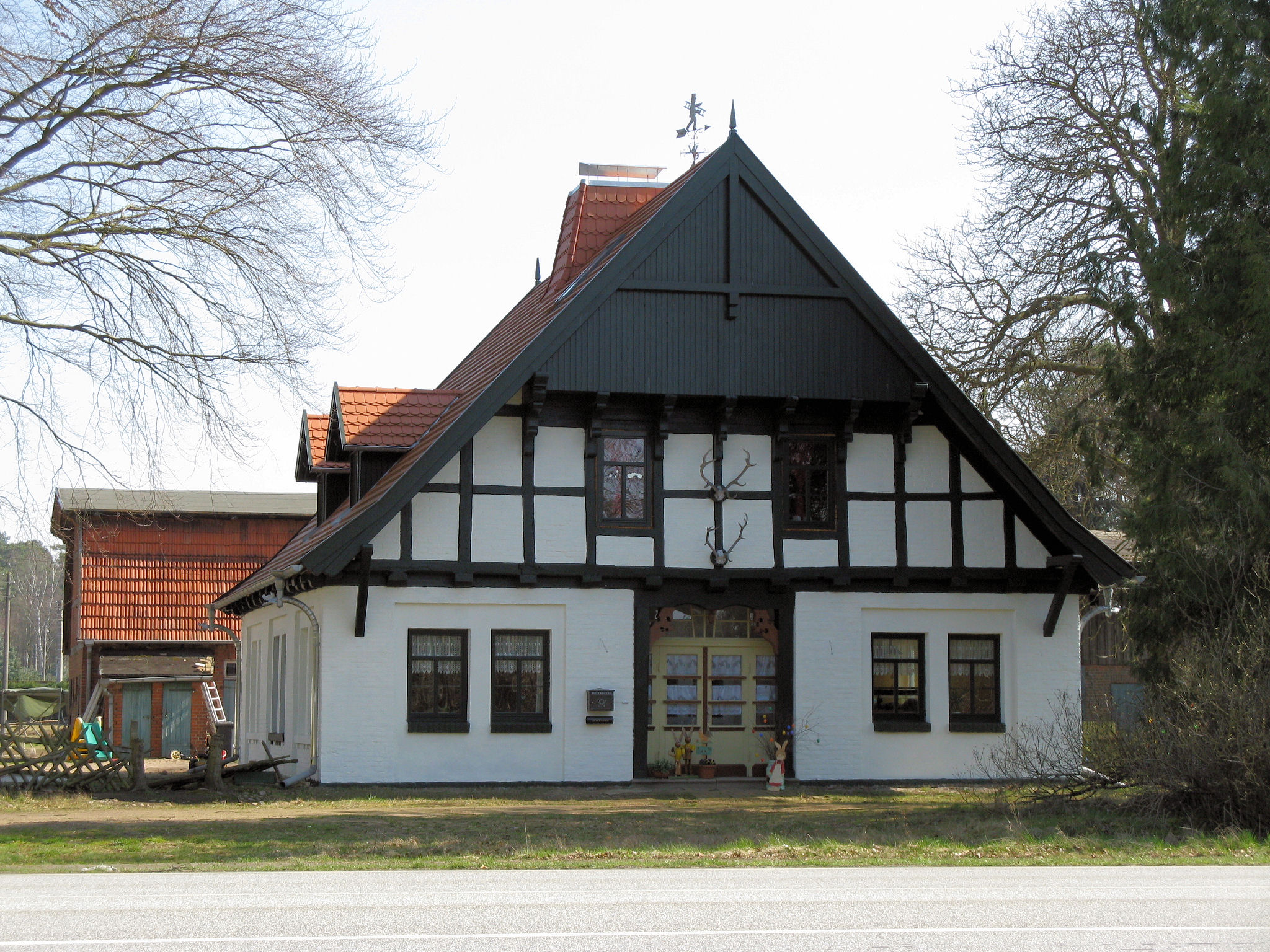
Forsthaus Hasenhäge near Lübesse

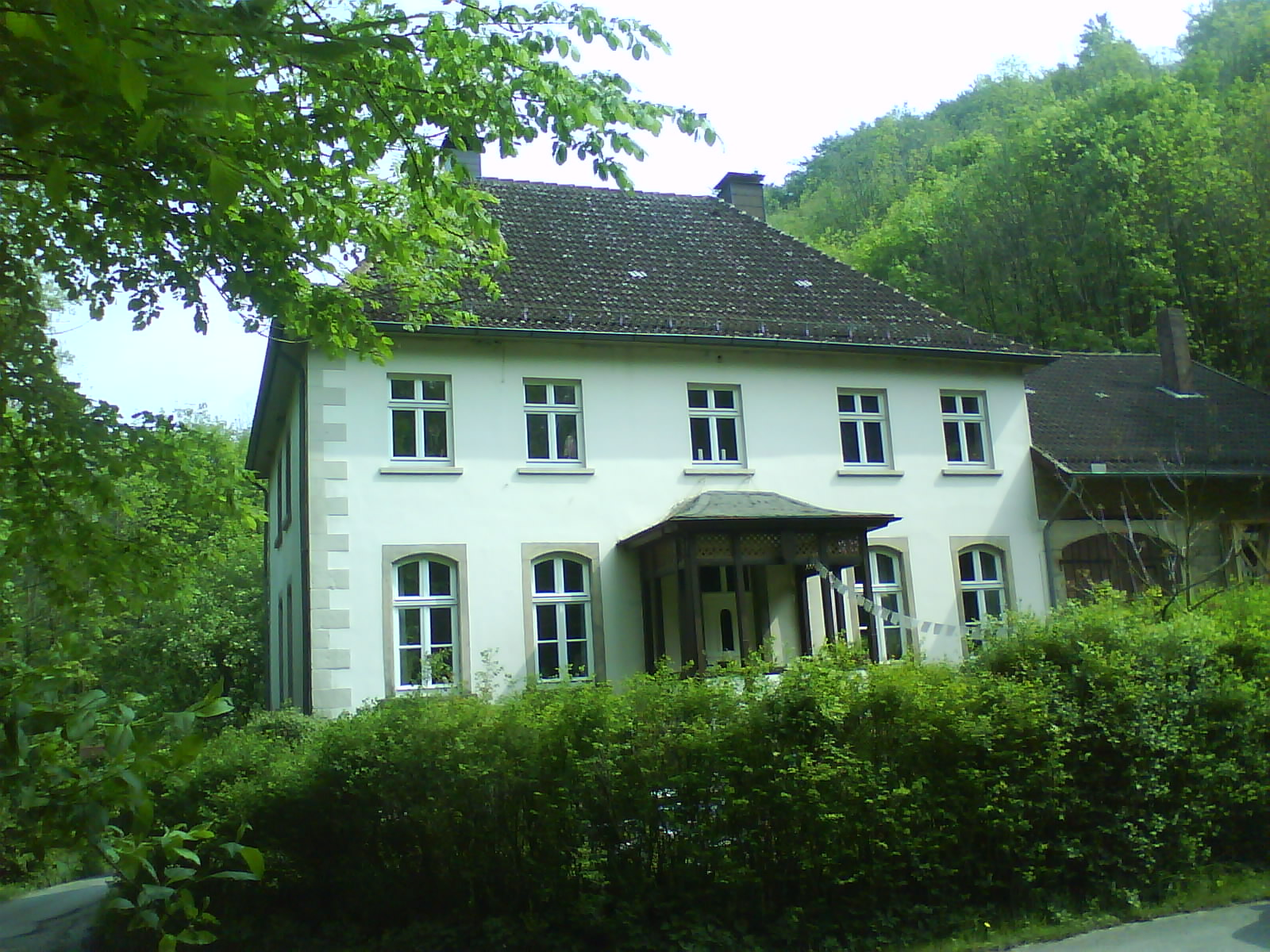
Forsthaus Hirschsprung near Berlebeck

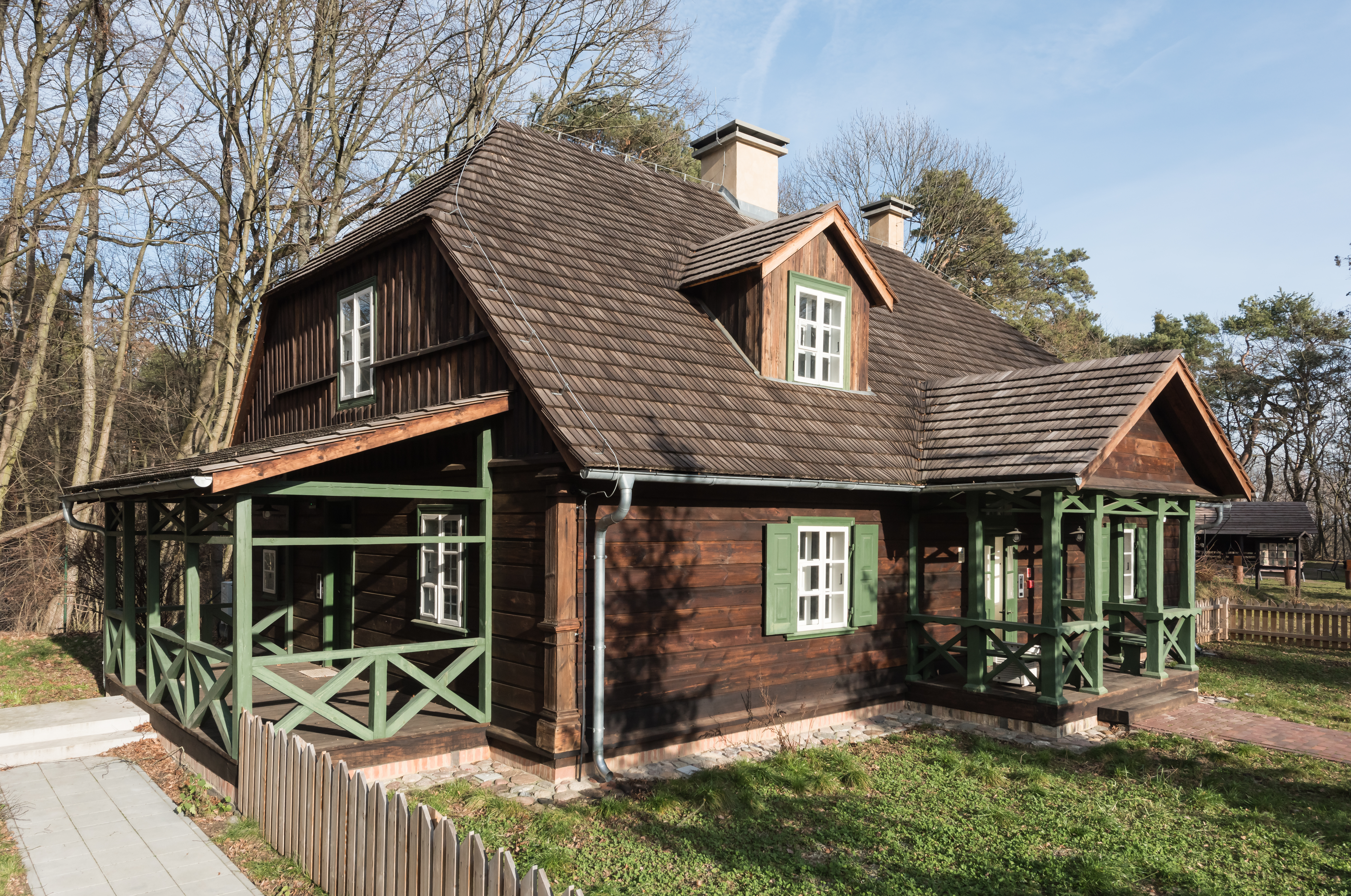
Forester's lodge in Warsaw

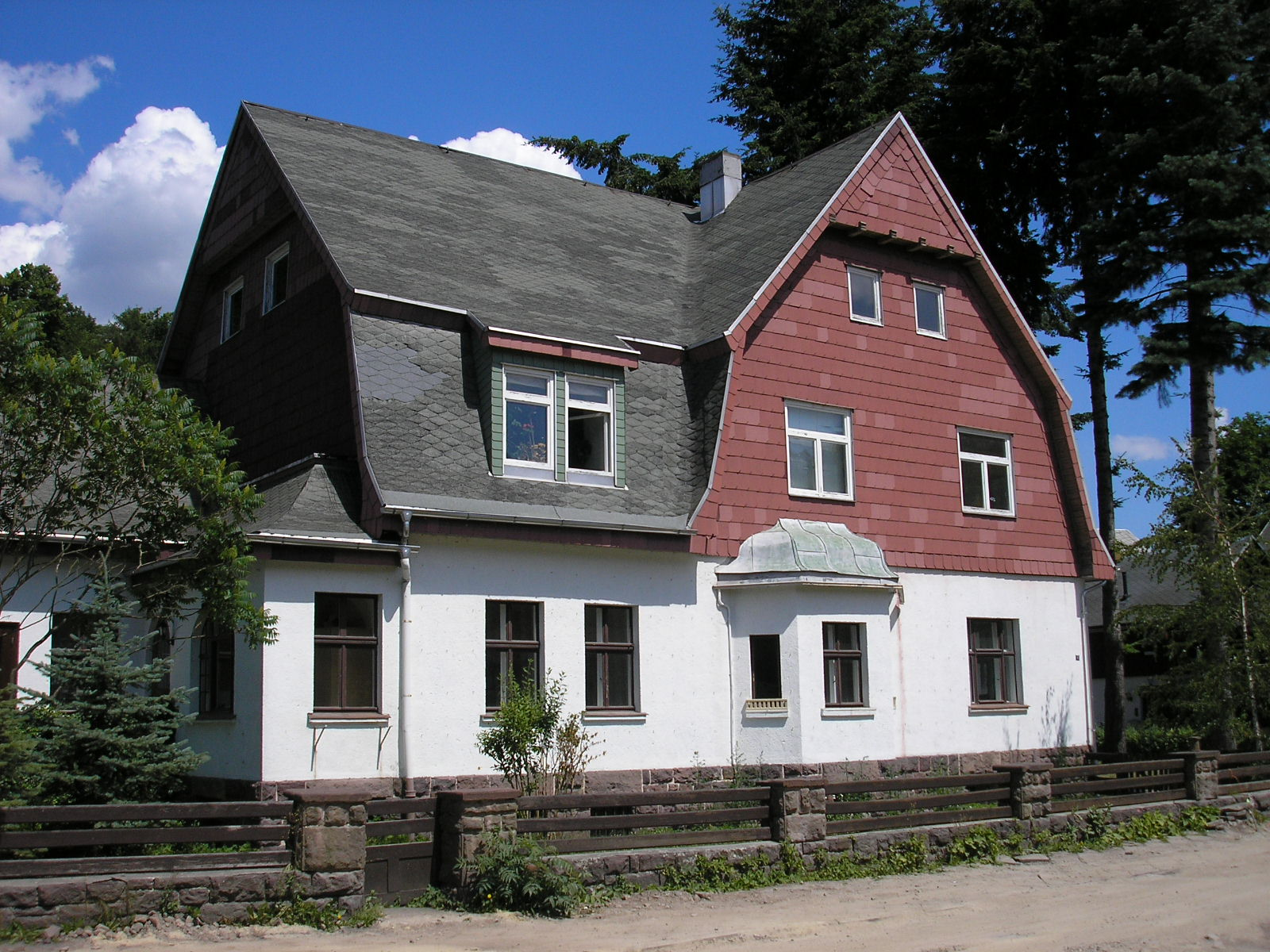
Lodge in Ilmenau

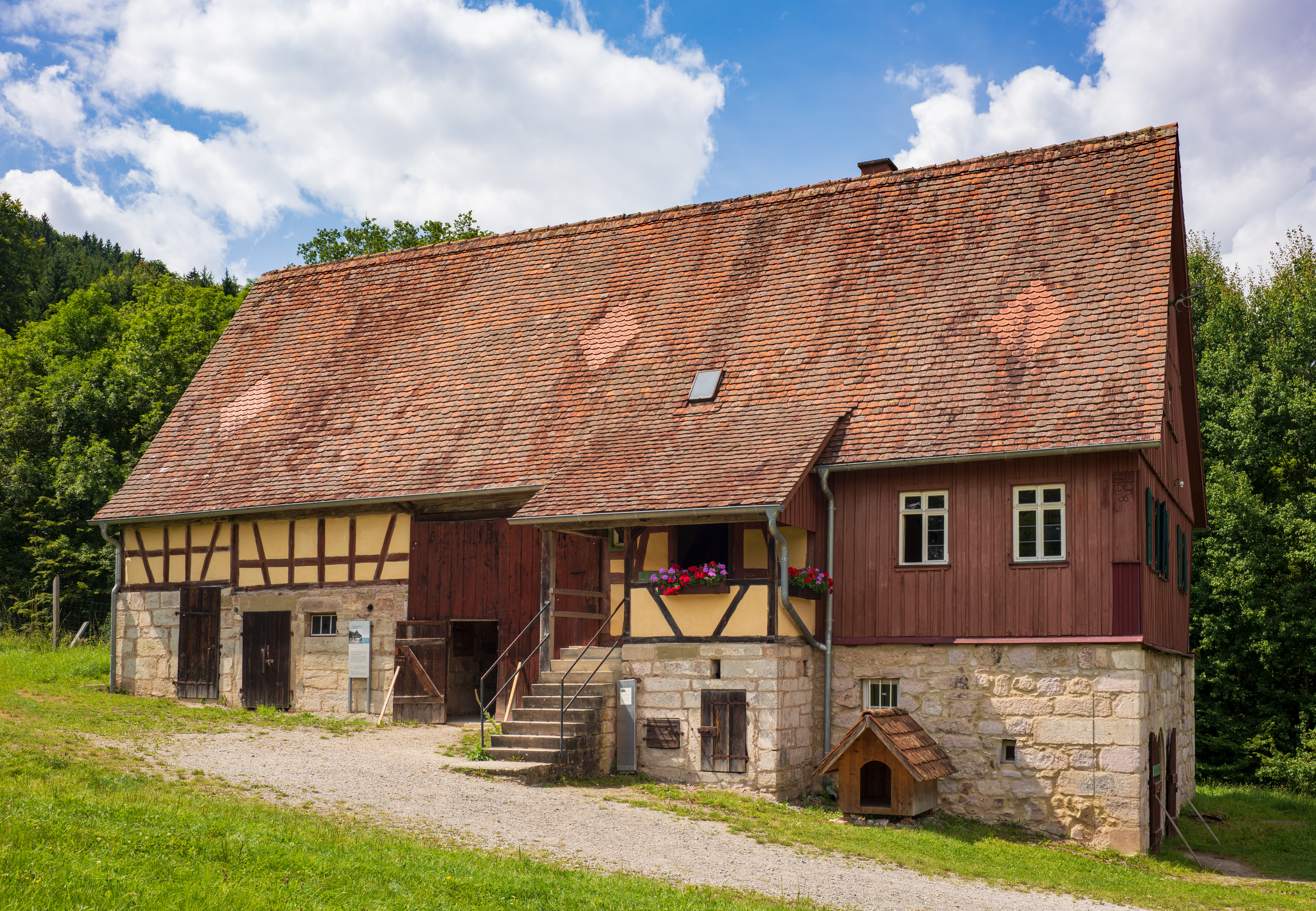
Forsthaus Joachimstal in the Wackershofen open air museum

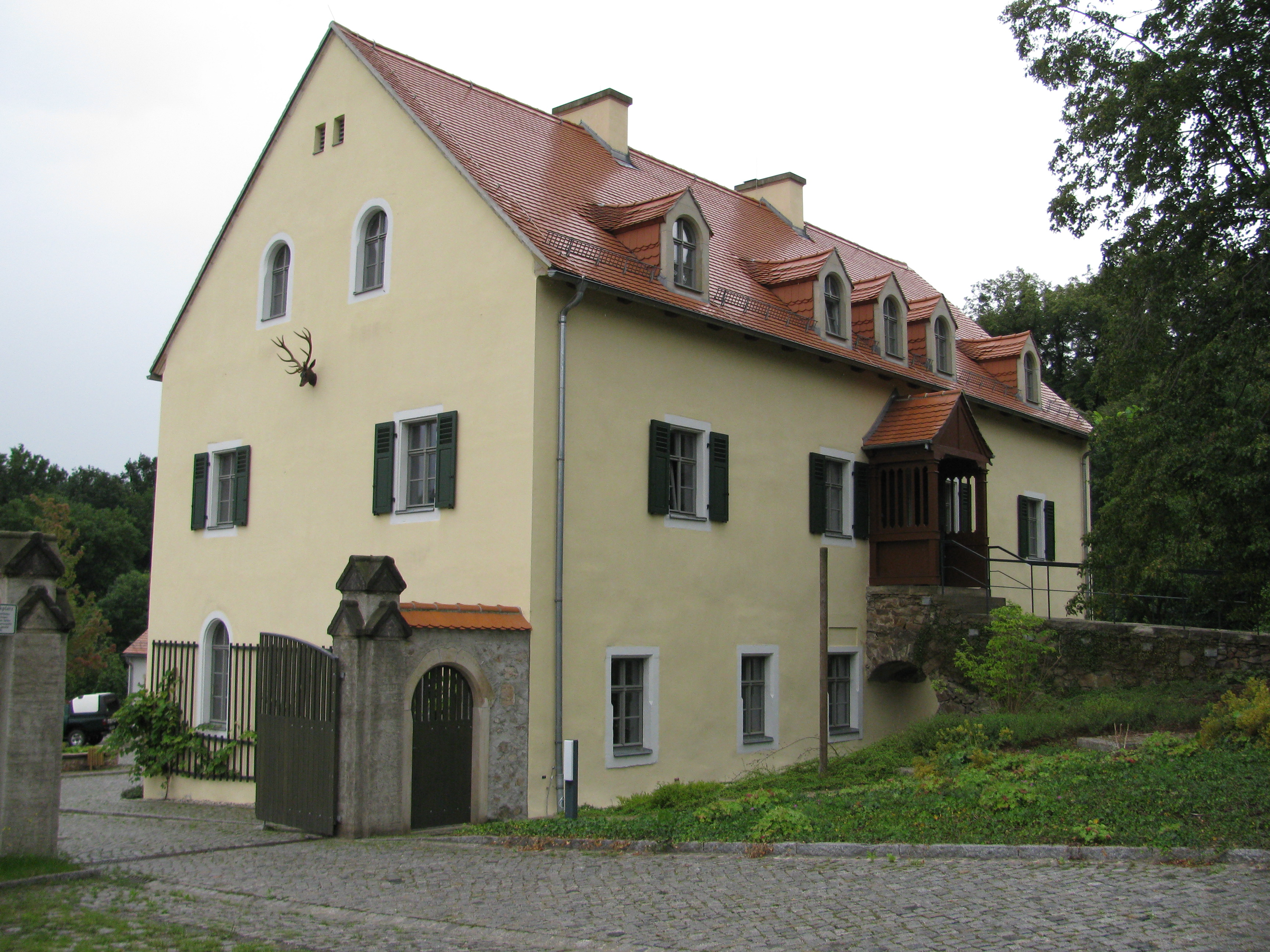
Forsthaus Kreyern

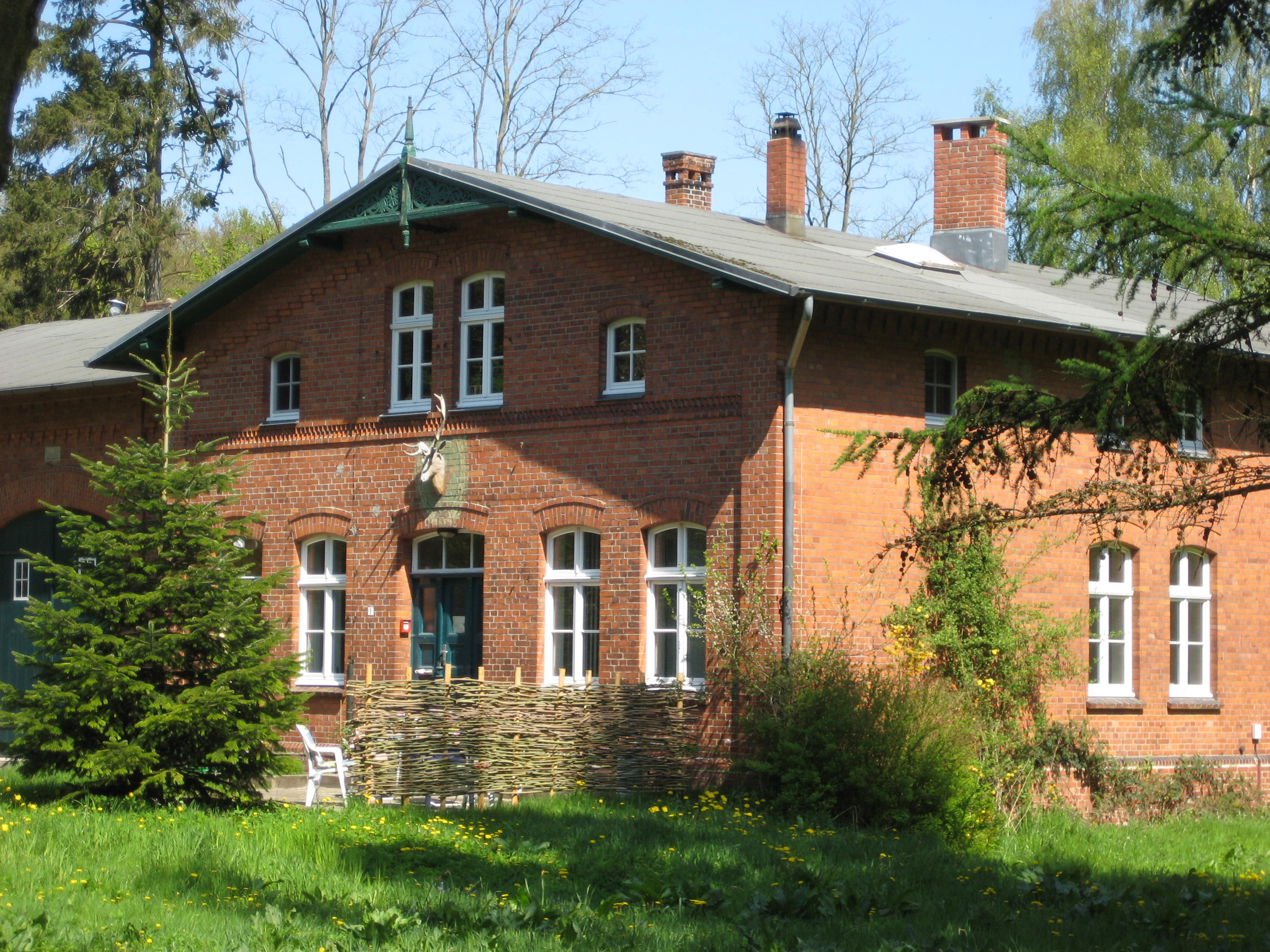
Old forester's lodge in the Lauerholz

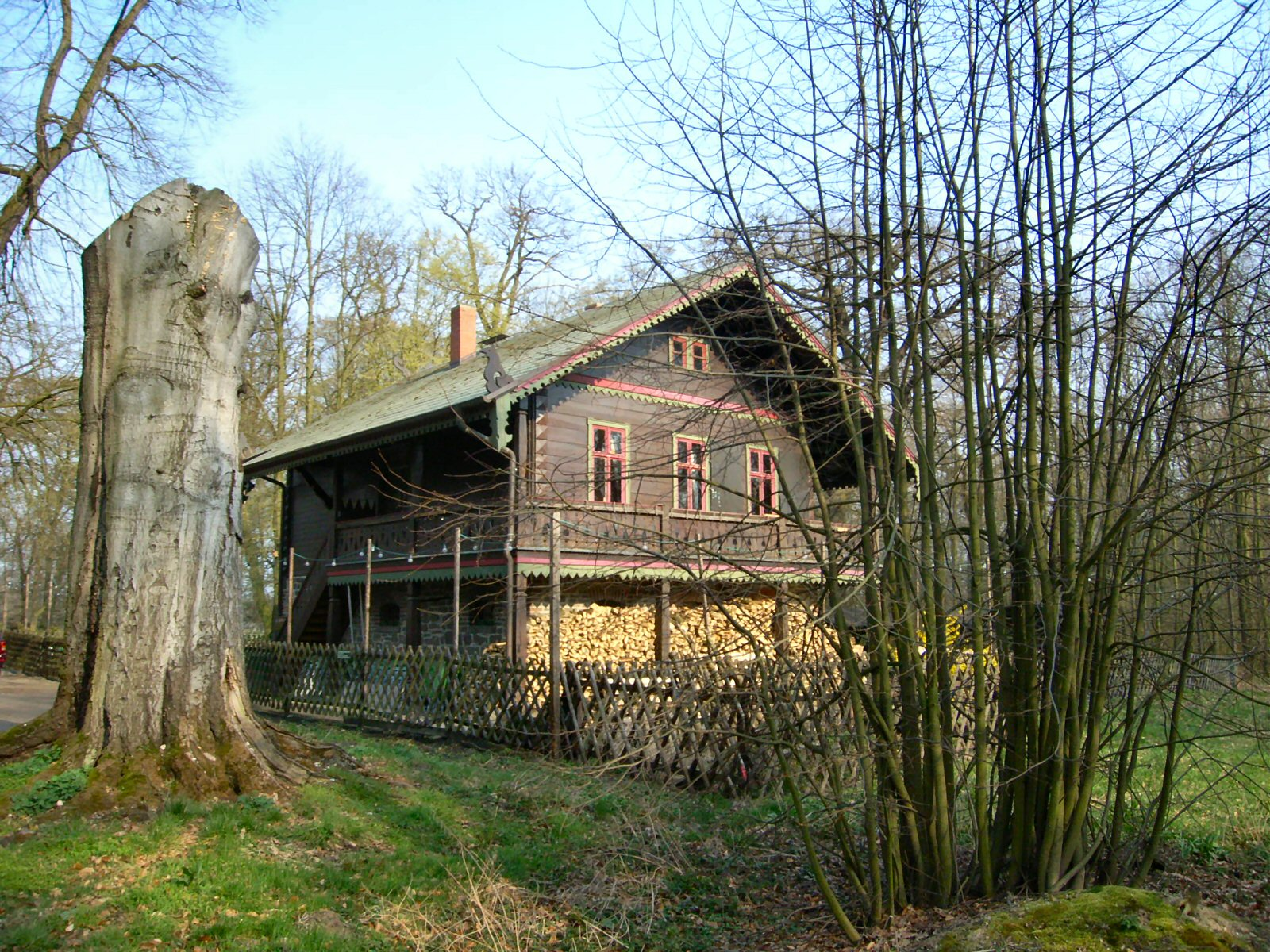
Old forester's lodge of Leiner Berg

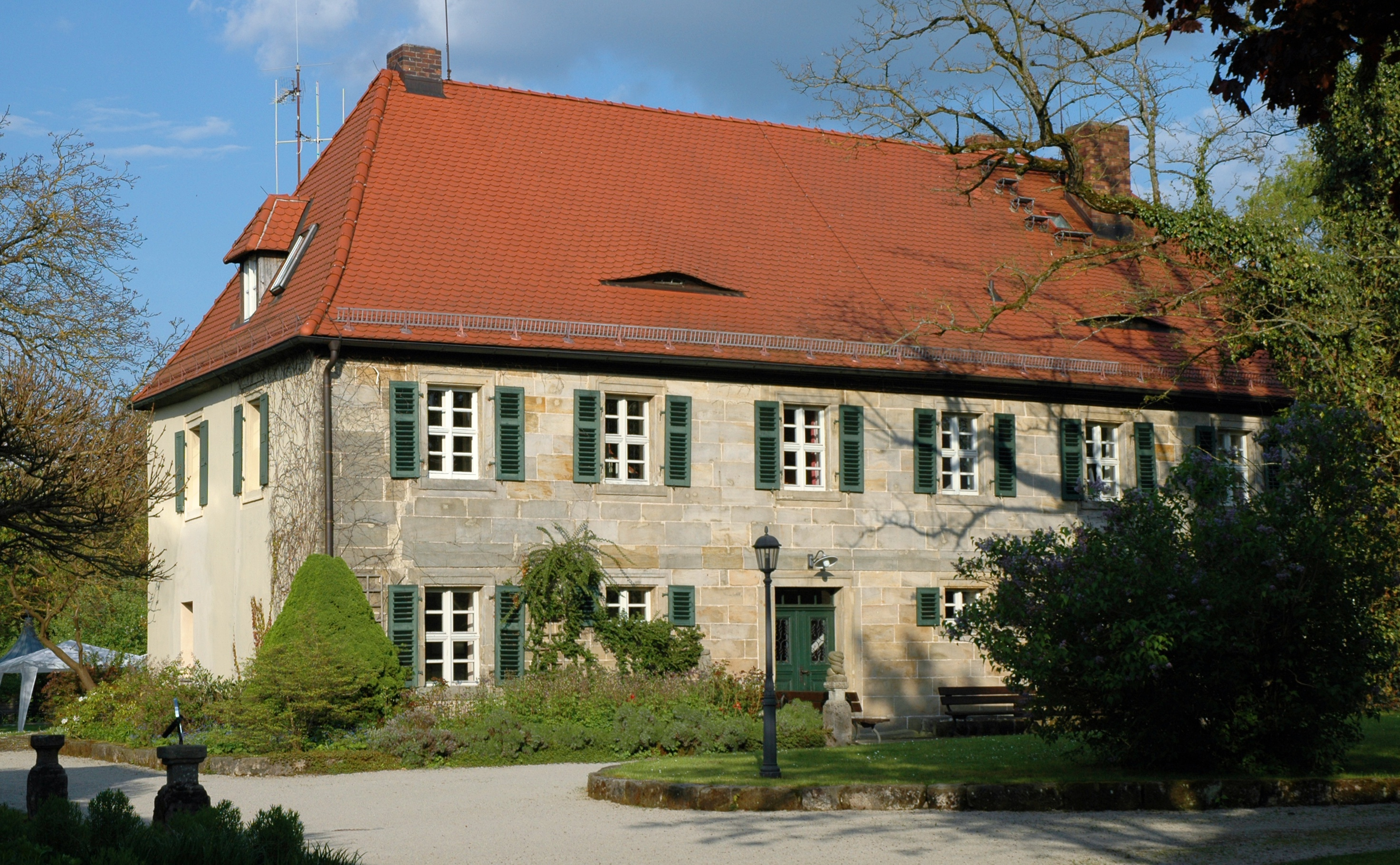
Forsthaus Oberwaiz (Eckersdorf)

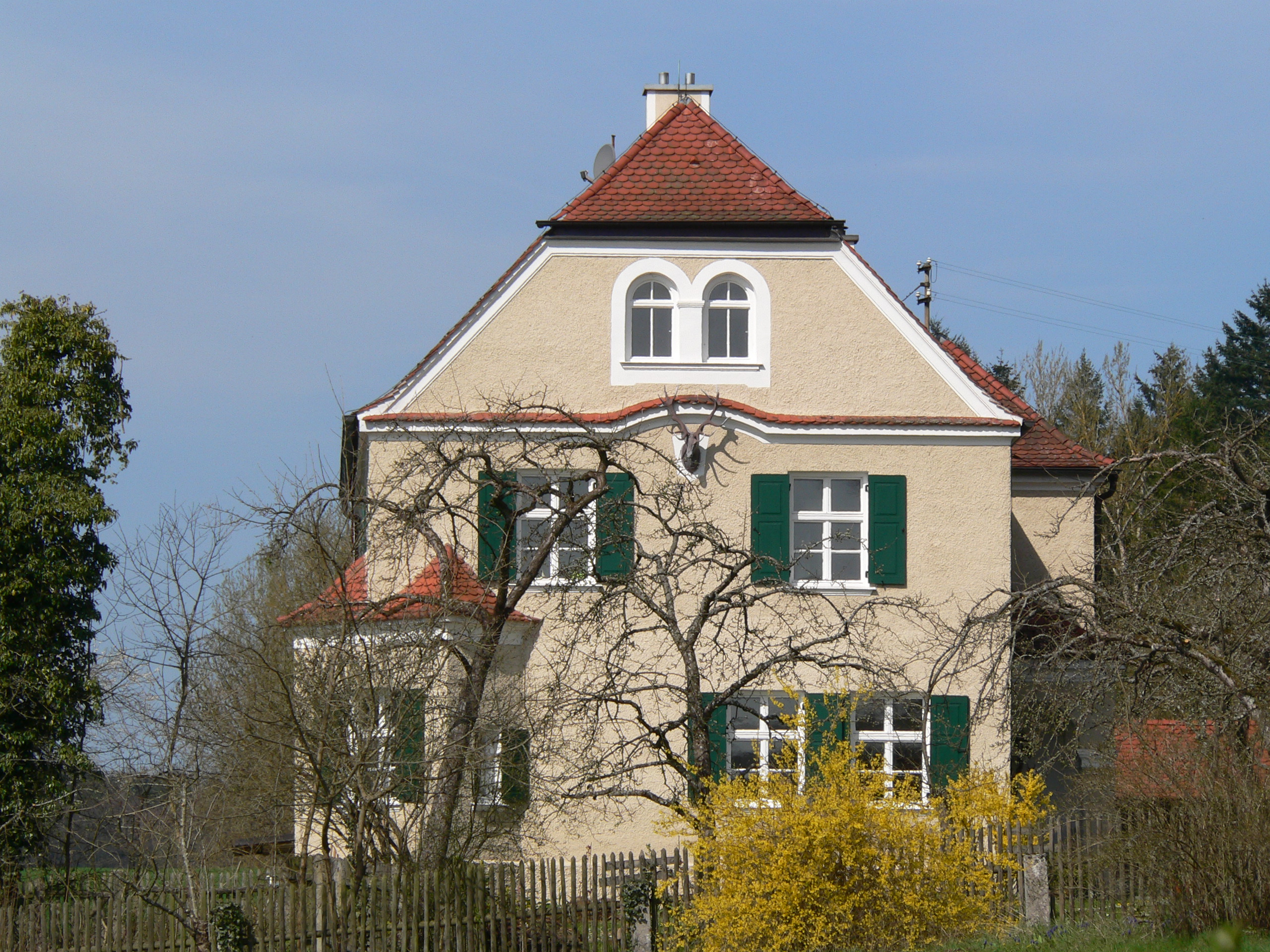
Schloss Sandersdorf

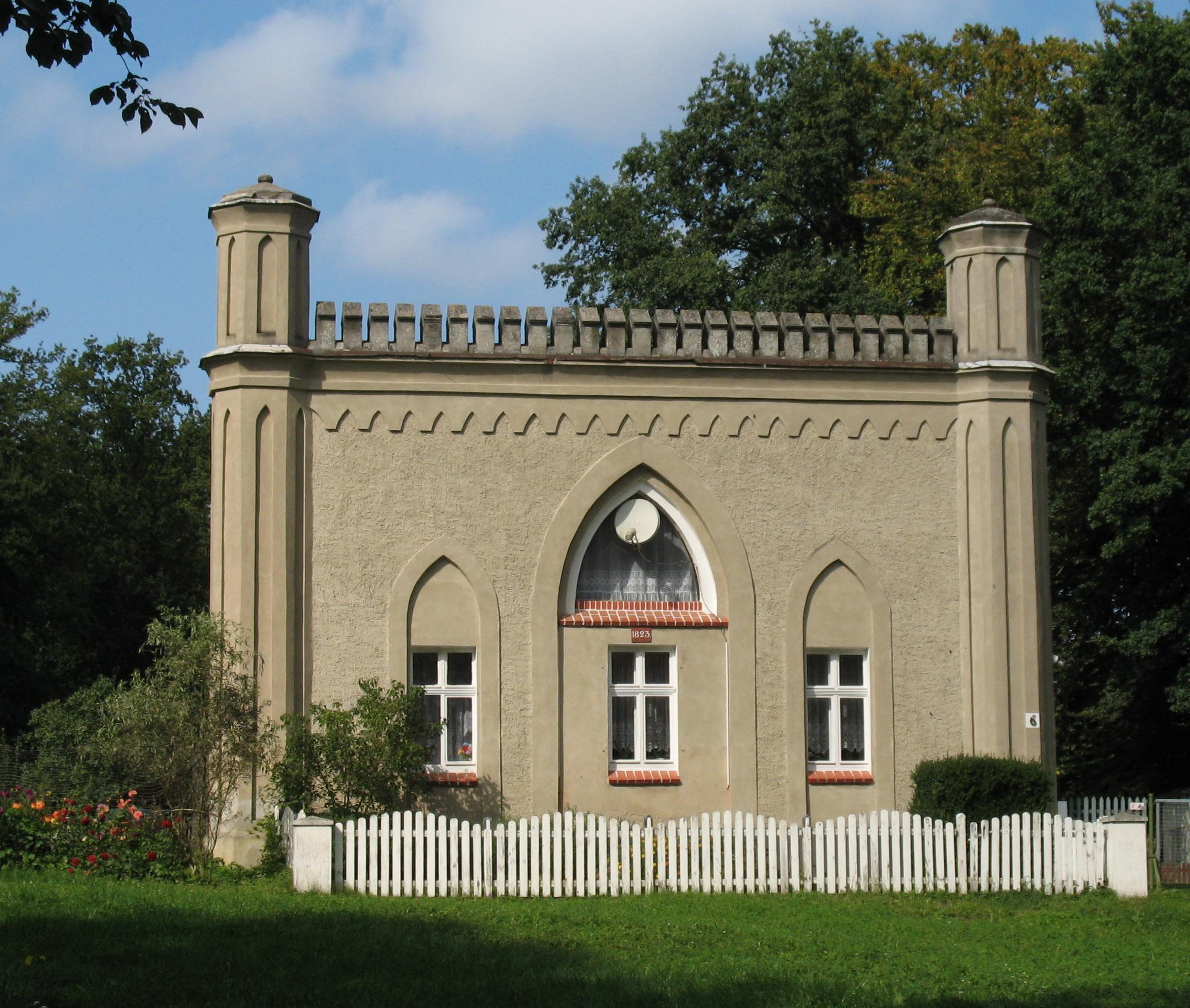
Old forester's lodge in Wolfshagen
