= Grabowo Cemetery =

Former cemetery in Szczecin, Poland

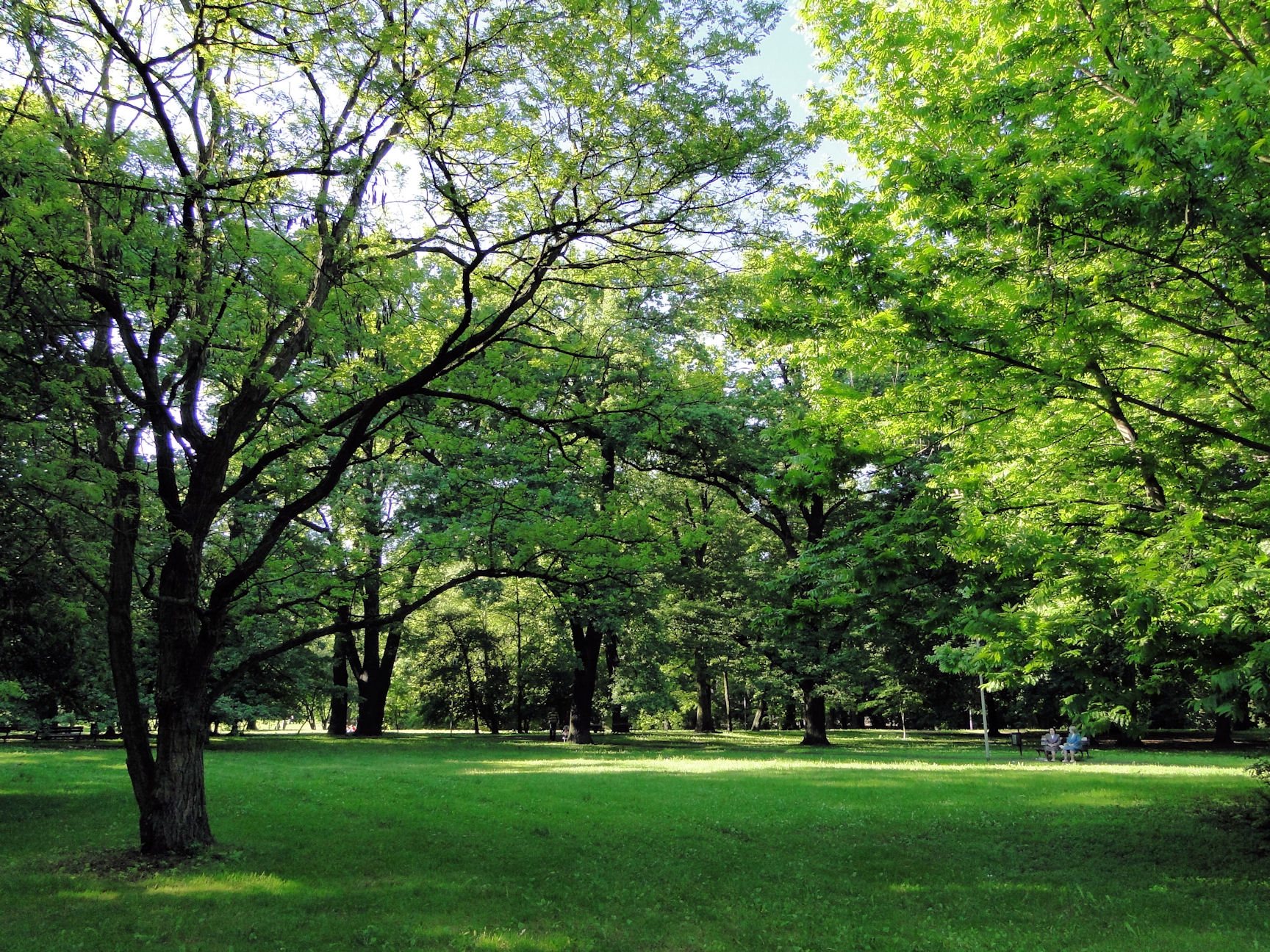
- The Stefan Żeromski Park in 2010, the location of the former Grabowo Cemetery.
- Interactive map of Grabowo Cemetery

Details
- Established: 1802
- Closed: 1910
- Location: Szczecin
- Country: Poland
- Coordinates: 53°26′N 14°34′E

The Grabowo Cemetery (Polish pronunciation: [ɡraˈbɔ.vɔ]; Polish: Cmentarz Grabowski; German: Grabower Friedhof) was a cemetery in Szczecin, Poland, located in the neighbourhoods of Old Town and Drzetowo-Grabowo, between Matejki, Malczewskiego, Wawelska, Starzyńskiego, and Zygmunta Starego, Paska, and Parkowa Streets. It was opened in 1802 and operated until 1910, when it was turned into the Grabowo Gardens (now known as the Stefan Żeromski Park), and most of the gravestones were removed, although some of the most historical importance were preserved until the 1950s. The graves themselves were never exhumated.

== History ==
In 1802, the city authorities of Szczecin enacted a law forbidding burying people in local churches and their adjusted cemeteries. As such, that year was opened a new large all-religion cemetery, with an area of 5.5 ha, named the Grabowo Cemetery. It was placed near current Malczewskiego Street, between Fort Leopold and the village of Grabowo.

Among first people buried there was Carl Böttcher (died 1803), one of the initiators of its construction. Other notable graves included Johann August Sack (died 1831), government official and the Supreme President of the Province of Pomerania, and painter Eduard Hildebrandt (died 1868).

In 1846, to the north of Malczewskiego Street, was opened another cemetery ground, in a form of a rectangle with length of 200 m, and width of 80 m. It was placed between buildings at current Malczewskiego, Kazimierza, Plater, and Parkowa Streets.

The cemetery was expanded to the area of the former nearby fortifications of Fort William and Fort Leopold, after they were demolished in 1873. It included the area between current Matejki Street, Malczewskiego Street, Parkowa Street, Wawelska Street, Starzyńskiego Street, and Zygmunta Starego Street. To the southeast, it bordered the French Reformed Church Cemetery, which dated to the 18th century.

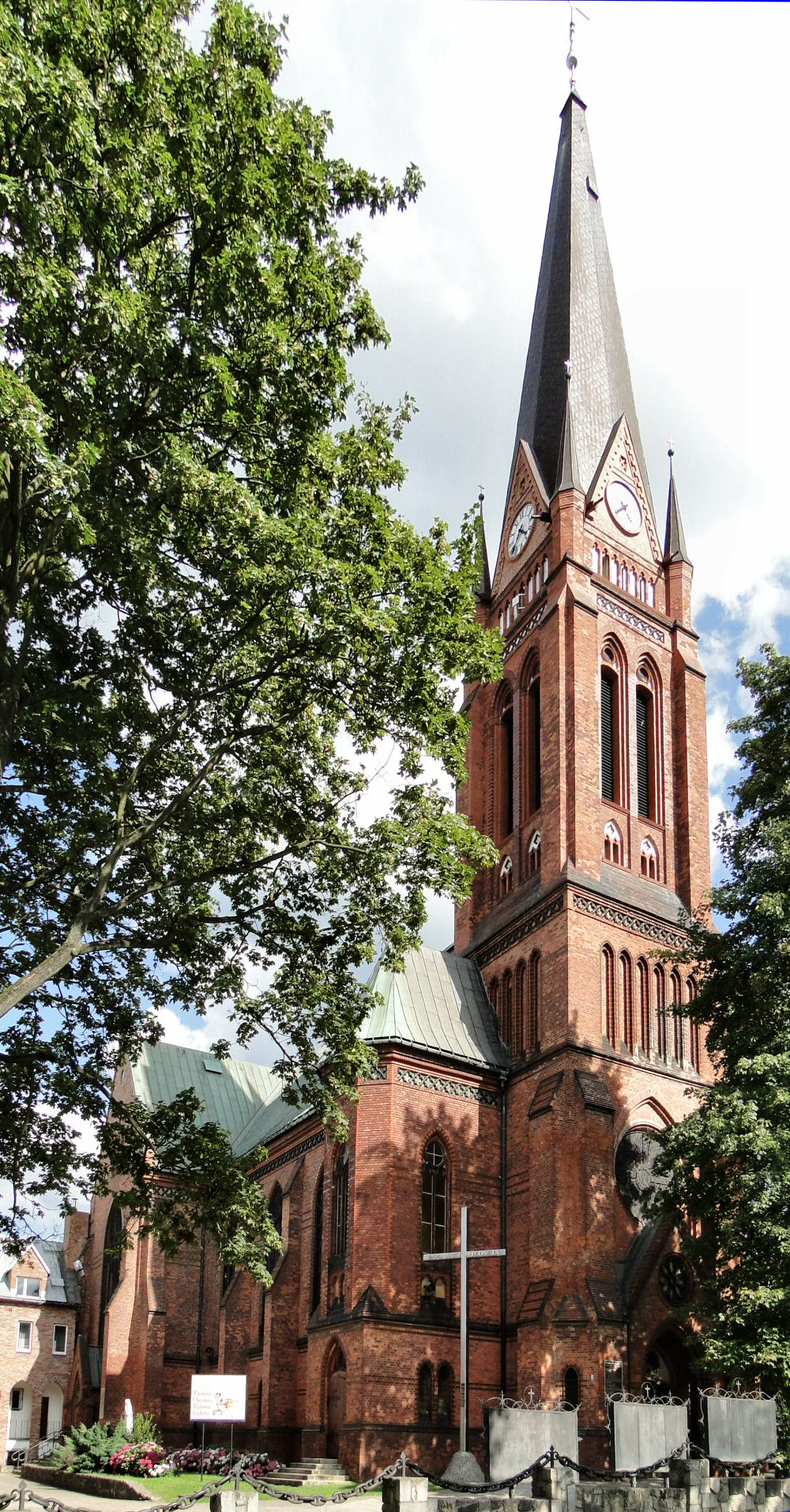
The St. Stanislaus Kostka Church opened near the cemetery in 1890.

At the end of the 19th century, the cemetery became full, and a portion of its graves deteriorated and was overgrown by nature. It was closed for new burials and replaced in that role by the Central Cemetery, opened in 1901. Between 1888 and 1890, to the north of the cemetery, was constructed the St. Stanislaus Kostka Church (then known as the Church of Peace).

Most of the gravestones were removed and in 1910, the cemetery was turned into a park, known as the Grabowo Gardens (German: Grabower Anlagen). There were placed fountains and coffeehouses. Several graves of historical importance, belonging to the most notable city inhabitants, were spared. In 1924, there was made an exception, in which Alberta Toepfer, a local entrepreneur and one of the richest inhabitants, was buried at the former cemetery.

After 1945, the park was renamed to Stefan Żeromski Park, while the former cemetery north of Malczewskiego Street was turned into the Stanisław Nadratowski Park. Most of the remaining graves were removed in the early 1950s, although a few of them survived to as far as the 1980s. The graves themselves were never exhumated.

In 2020, during the construction in the park was uncovered a black granite gravestone dating to 1867. It belonged to stockbroker Johan-Julius Röscher (1800–1867), and remains the oldest surviving gravestone from the Grabowo Cemetery. The gravestone was moved to the Central Cemetery.
