= Legi =

Legi may refer to:

- Legi, a day in the Pasaran cycle of the Javanese calendar
- Łęgi (disambiguation), the name of several places in Poland
- N,N'-diacetyllegionaminate synthase, an enzyme
- Giacomo Legi, a Baroque painter of Flemish descent who was active principally in Italy during the first half of the 17th century.
