= Stefan Żeromski Park (Szczecin) =

Urban park in Szczecin, Poland

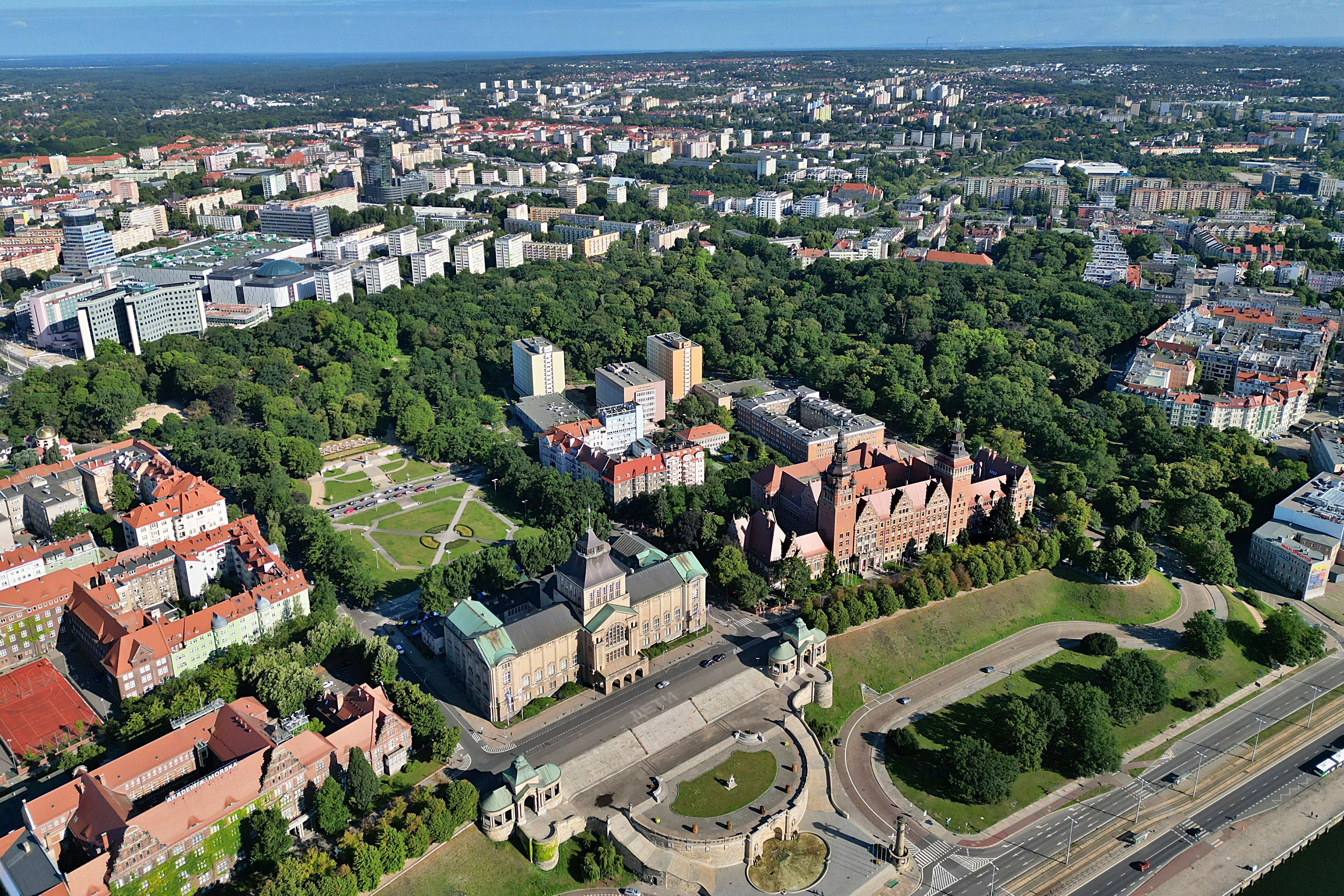
- The Stefan Żeromski Park in 2022.
- Interactive map of Stefan Żeromski Park
- Type: Urban park, arboretum
- Location: Szczecin, Poland
- Coordinates: 53°26′00″N 14°33′45″E
- Area: 21.97 ha (54.3 acres)
- Created: 1910

The Stefan Żeromski Park (Polish pronunciation: [ˈstɛ.fan ʐɛˈrɔm.ski]; Polish: Park im. Stefana Żeromskiego) until 1945 known as the Grabowo Gardens (Polish pronunciation: [ɡraˈbɔ.vɔ]; German: Grabower Anlagen; Polish: Ogrody Grabowskie) is an urban park and arboretum in Szczecin, Poland. It is located in the Old Town neighborhood, within the Downtown district, between Matejki, Malczewskiego, Parkowa, Kapitańska, Storrady, Wawelska, Starzyńskiego, and Zygmunta Starego Streets. With an area of 21.97 ha, it is the second largest park in the city. It was established in 1910, in place of the former Grabowo Cemetery.

== Name ==
The park is named after Stefan Żeromski, a 19th- and 20th-century novelist and dramatist. Before 1945, it was known as the Grabowo Gardens (German: Grabower Anlagen).

== History ==
Between 1735 and 1741, Fort Leopold was constructed to the southeast of the current park, as part of the city fortifications of the Szczecin Fortress. It was designed by Gerhard Cornelius van Wallrawe.

In the first half of the 18th century the Reformed Christian cemetery was also founded in the area. It was used by the French community, which had begun settling in the city after 1721. It was located between current Storrady Street, Wawelska Street, Parkowa Street, and Kapitańska Street.

In 1802, the local authorities enacted a law forbidding burying people in churches and their adjacent cemeteries, that were located within the city walls. Accordingly, the Grabowo Cemetery, a new large all-religion cemetery, with an area of 5.5 ha was opened that year. It was placed near current Malczewskiego Street, between Fort Leopold and the village of Grabowo.

Among the first people buried there was Carl Böttcher (died 1803), one of the initiators of its construction. Other notable graves included Johann August Sack (died 1831), government official and the Supreme President of the Province of Pomerania, and painter Eduard Hildebrandt (died 1868).

In 1846 another cemetery area was opened, to the north of Malczewskiego Street, in a form of a rectangle with length of 200 m, and width of 80 m. It was placed between buildings at current Malczewskiego, Kazimierza, Plater, and Parkowa Streets.

In 1873, the city fortifications, including Fort Leopold, were dismantled. The cemetery was expanded in their place, including the area between current Matejki Street, Malczewskiego Street, Parkowa Street, Wawelska Street, Starzyńskiego Street, and Zygmunta Starego Street. To the southeast, it bordered the French Reformed Church Cemetery.

At the end of the 19th century, the cemetery became full, and a portion of its graves deteriorated and became overgrown. It was closed for new burials and replaced in that role by the Central Cemetery, opened in 1901. Between 1888 and 1890, the St. Stanislaus Kostka Church (then known as the Church of Peace) was constructed to the north of the cemetery.

Between 1902 and 1907, the Haken Terrace scenic boulevard (now known as the Chrobry Embankment) was developed to the south of the cemetery at the former fortification ramparts. Between 1906 and 1921, the Stettin Region Administrative Building (now Szczecin Voivodeship Office, the City Museum (now National Museum in Szczecin), and the social insurance institution and Chief Customs Directorate buildings (both now housing the Maritime University of Szczecin) were constructed alongside it.

Most of the gravestones of the Grabowo Cemetery were removed in 1910, with the area being turned into a park, known as the Grabowo Gardens (German: Grabower Anlagen). Fountains and a coffeehouse were installed. Several graves of historical importance, belonging to the most notable city inhabitants, were spared. In 1924, an exception was made and Albert Toepfer, a local entrepreneur and one of the richest inhabitants, was buried at the former cemetery. In 1912, the Park House (German: Parkhaus) café, designed by Wilhelm Meyer-Schwartau was opened. Currently, since 1995, the Park Hotel occupies the building. In 1913, at the square next to the park was unveiled a bronze equestrian statue dedicated to Frederick III, the Emperor of Germany in 1888. It was made by Ludwig Manzel, and stood there until 1942, when it was taken down to be melted for materials for the military

In 1906, in front of the Park House building was placed the Statue of Flora, a Baroque sandstone sculpture dating to around 1730. In 1945, following the end of the Second World War it was found partially destroyed, laying in front of the Palace of the Pomeranian Estates Assembly. Following the renovations, it was placed at the park boundary, and was relocated next to the King's Gate in 1957.

The French Reformed Church Cemetery was renovated in 1926, and a brick chapel and a wooden gardener's building were constructed. It was closed for burials in 1937. The chapel was destroyed during the Second World War. After 1945, it began being known as Żabikowo Cemetery among the Polish population which settled in the city following the end of the conflict.

After 1945, the Grabowo Gardens were renamed as Stefan Żeromski Park, while the former cemetery north of Malczewskiego Street was turned into the Stanisław Nadratowski Park. Most of the remaining gravestones were removed in the early 1950s, although a few of them survived to as far as the 1980s. The graves themselves were never exhumed. The gravestones at the nearby French Reformed Church Cemetery were also removed in 1965, and it was incorporated into the park.

On 3 May 1960, the statue of Adam Mickiewicz, designed by Sławomir Lewiński, was unveiled at the Mickiewicz Square next to the park. It consists of a concrete statue depicting its namesake, a 19th-century poet, writer, and political activist. It was placed at the former location of the statue of Frederick III.

In the 1970s, a monument dedicated to its namesake, Stefan Żeromski, and a few sculptures were unveiled in the park.

Since 1983, the park has the status of a protected cultural property.

In 2020, during the construction works, a black granite gravestone dating to 1867 was uncovered in the park. It belonged to stockbroker Johan-Julius Röscher (1800–1867), and remains the oldest surviving gravestone from the Grabowo Cemetery. It was moved to the Central Cemetery.

== Characteristics ==
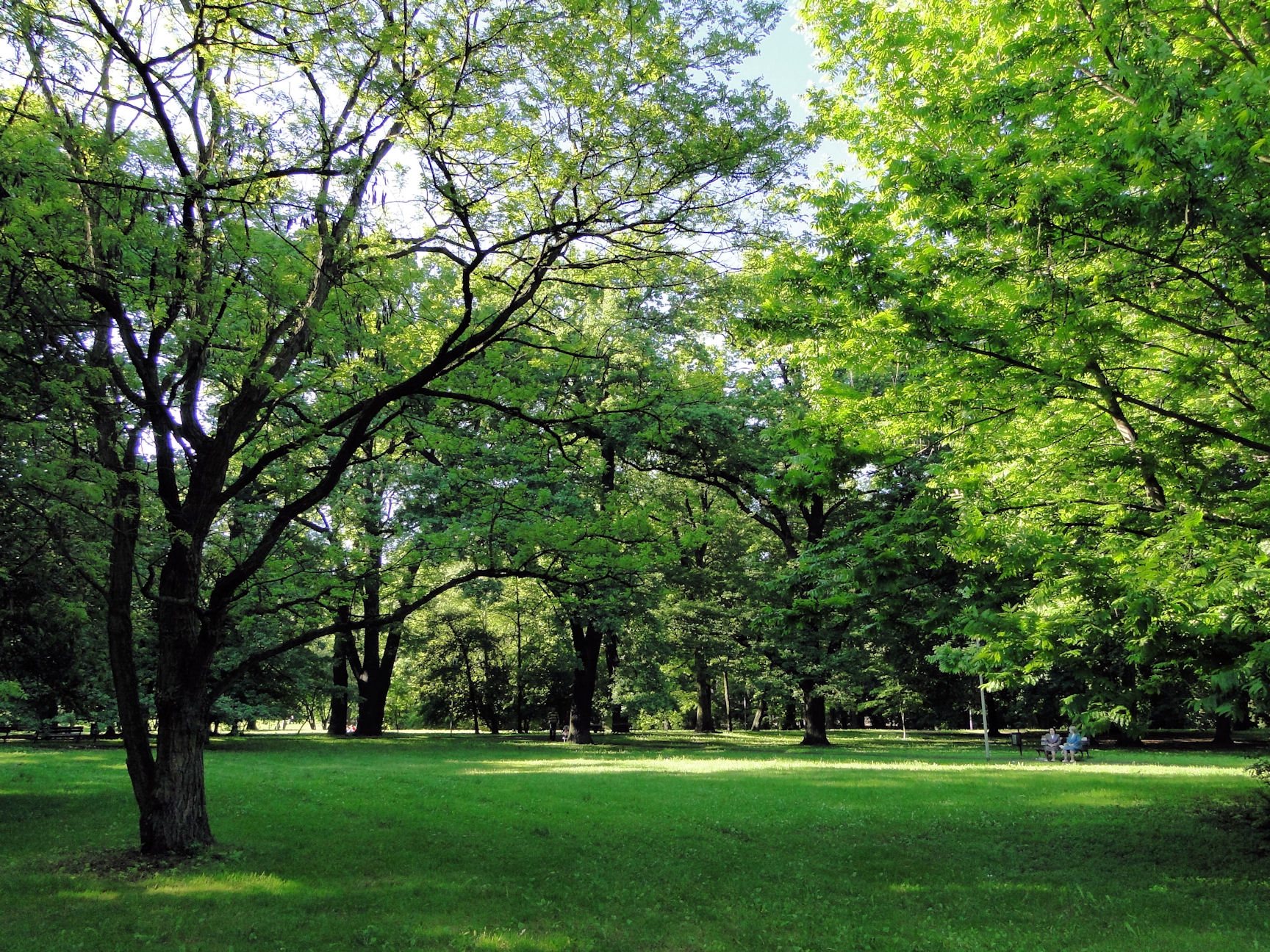
Stefan Żeromski Park in 2010.

The park is located in the Old Town neighborhood, within the Downtown district, between Matejki, Malczewskiego, Parkowa, Kapitańska, Storrady, Wawelska, Starzyńskiego, and Zygmunta Starego Streets. With an area of 21.97 ha, it is the second largest park in the city, after the Jan Kasprowicz Park.

It is an arboretum with around 177 species of trees and bushes growing there.

There are also located a few sculptures, them being:

- the monument dedicated to Stefan Żeromski, made in 1978 by Sławomir Lewiński;
- sculpture Prometheus by Anna Paszkiewicz from 1978;
- sculpture The Fountain by Sławomir Lewiński from 1977;
- and sculpture The Motherhood by Anna Paszkiewicz from 1970.

There are also two rocks with statues of natural monuments, them being:

- a rock with plaque dedicated to child camp followers;
- and a rock named Adam.

To the southeast from the park are placed two urban squares, located between Starzyńskiego, Szczerbowca, Jarowita, and Zygmunta Starego Streets, and separated by Henryka Pobożnego Street. They are the Adam Mickiewicz Square (Polish: Plac Adama Mickiewicza) to the north, and Women's Rights Square (Polish: Plac Praw Kobiet) to the south. The former includes the Adam Mickiewicz Monument, made in 1960 by Sławomir Lewiński.

In the park is located the Park Hotel, a historical building dating to 1912. Around the park are also located numerous notable buildings, such as Chrobry Embankment, Szczecin Philharmonic, National Museum in Szczecin, St. Nicholas Church, Maritime University of Szczecin, and Szczecin Voivodeship Office. To the northeast it borders the Stanisław Nadratowski Park.

The park has the status of a protected cultural property.

== Gallery ==
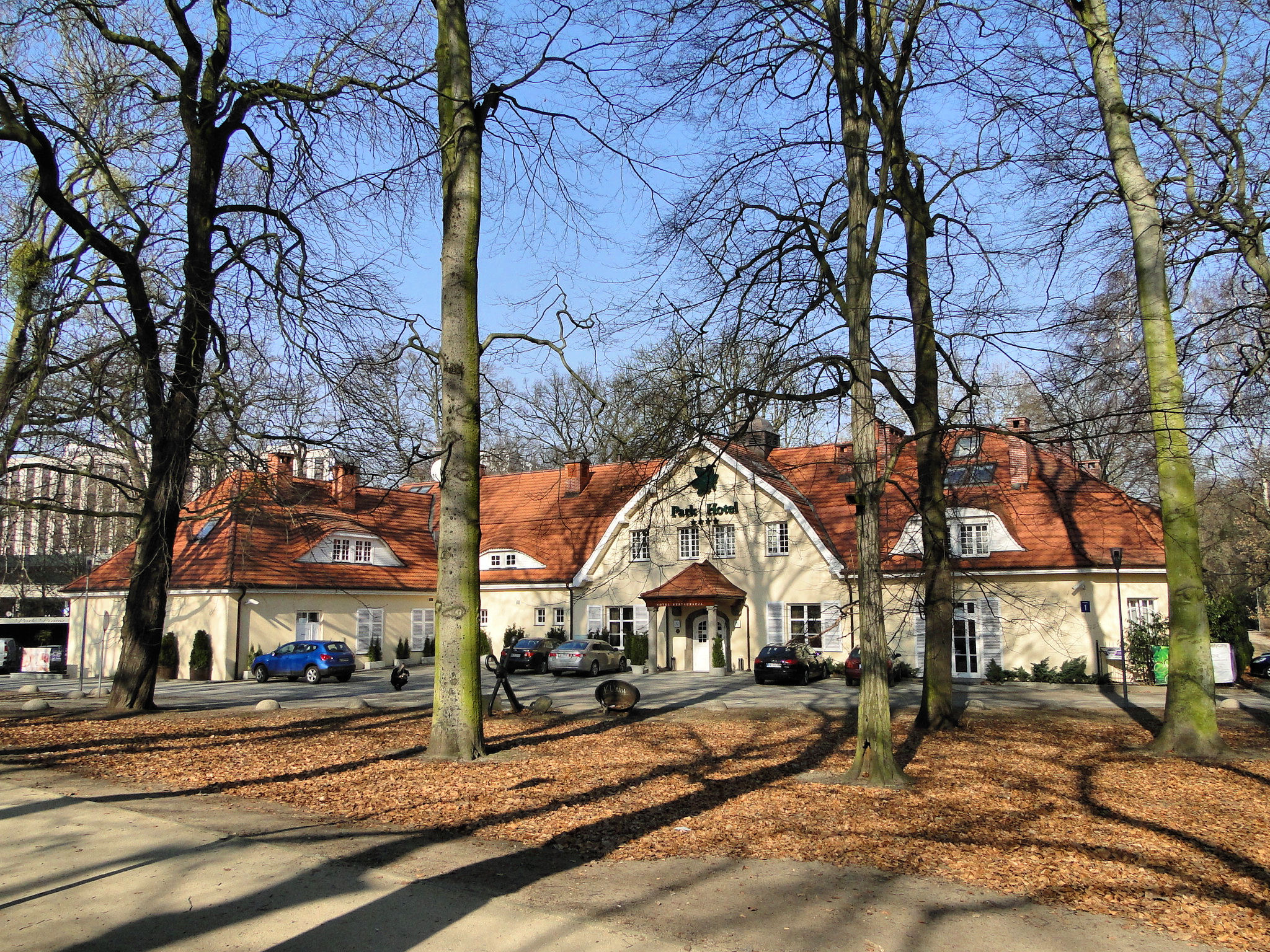
The Park Hotel in 2011.

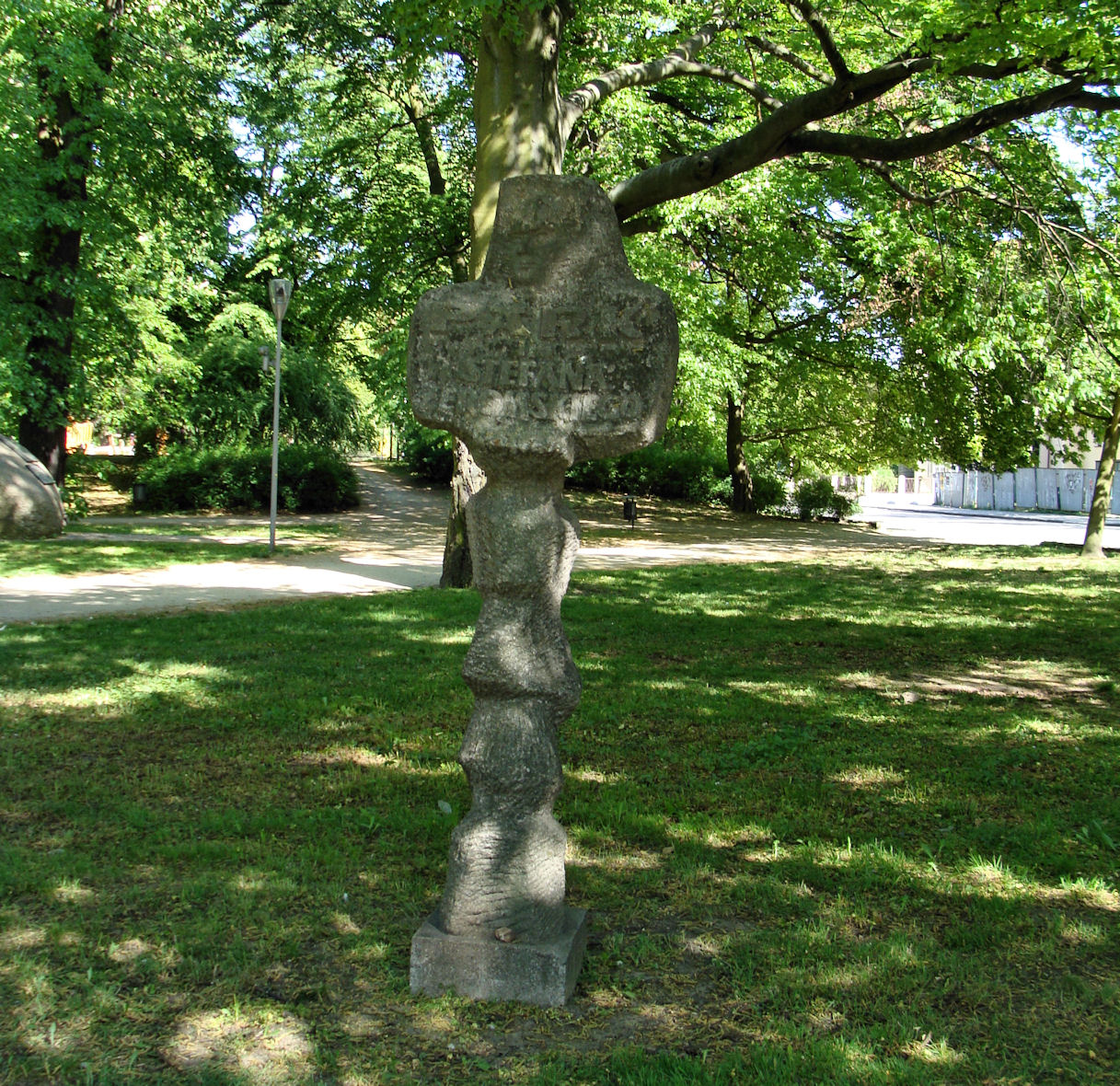
Monument dedicated to Stefan Żeromski.

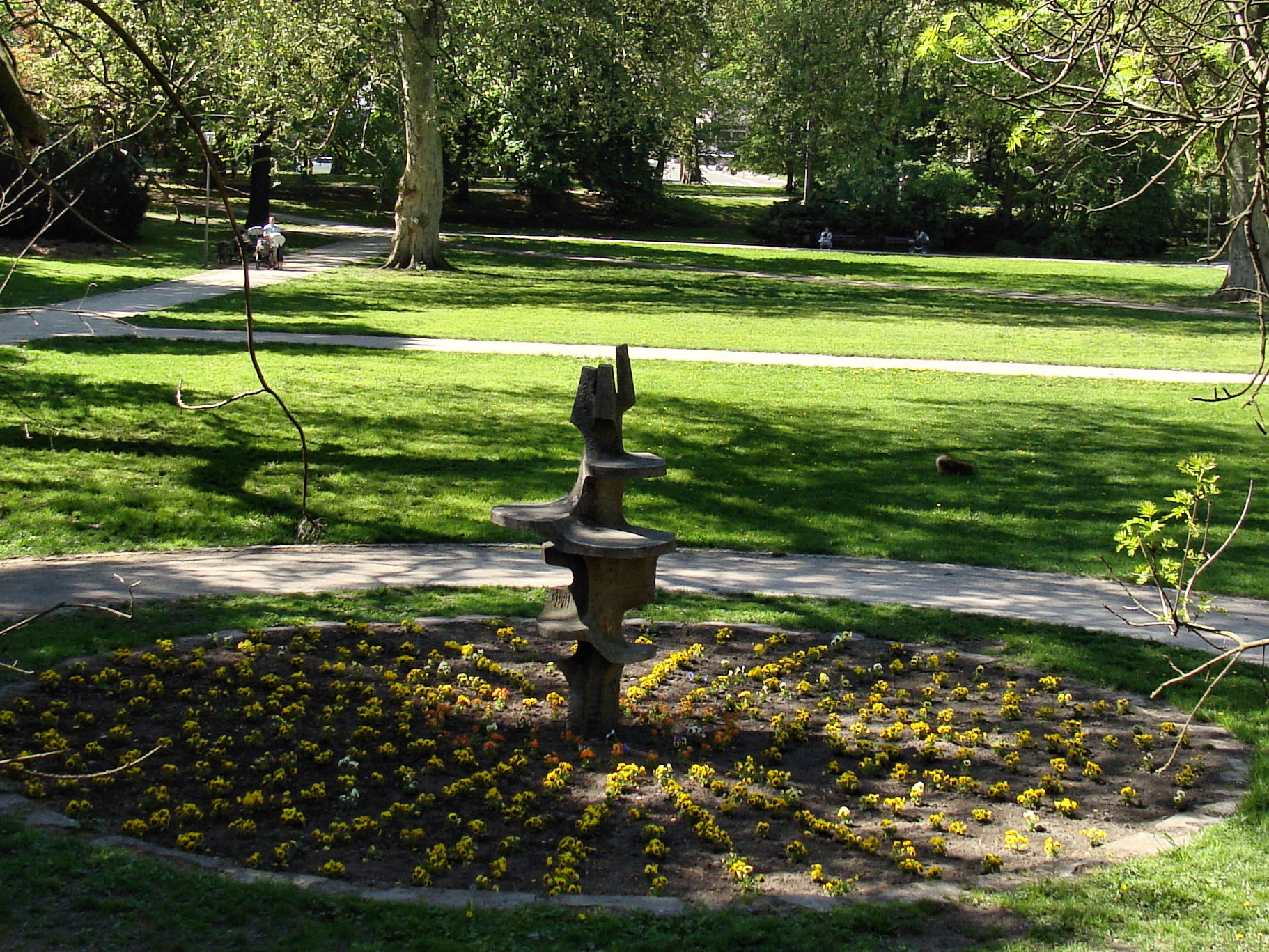
Sculpture Fountain

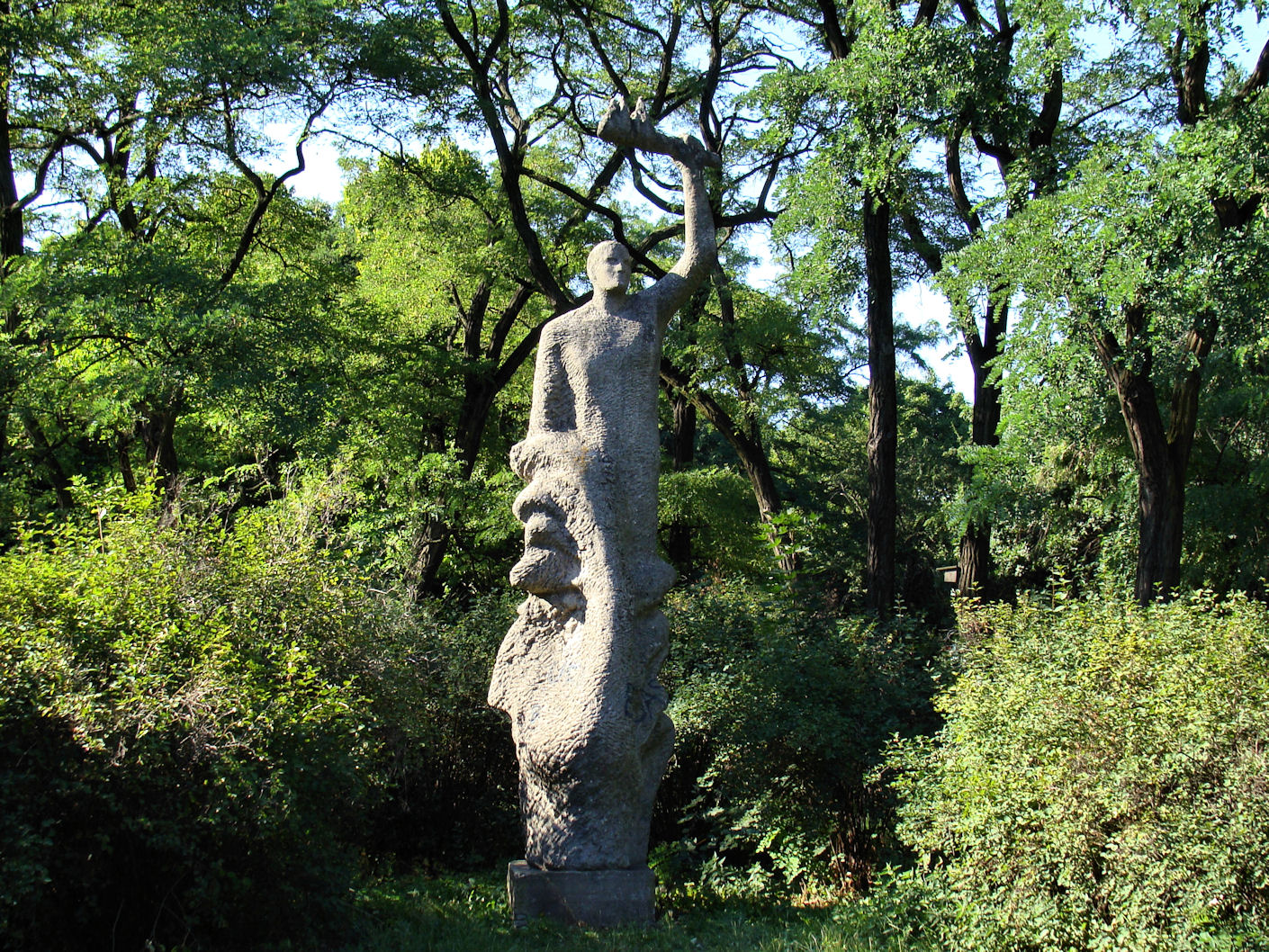
Sculptures Prometheus

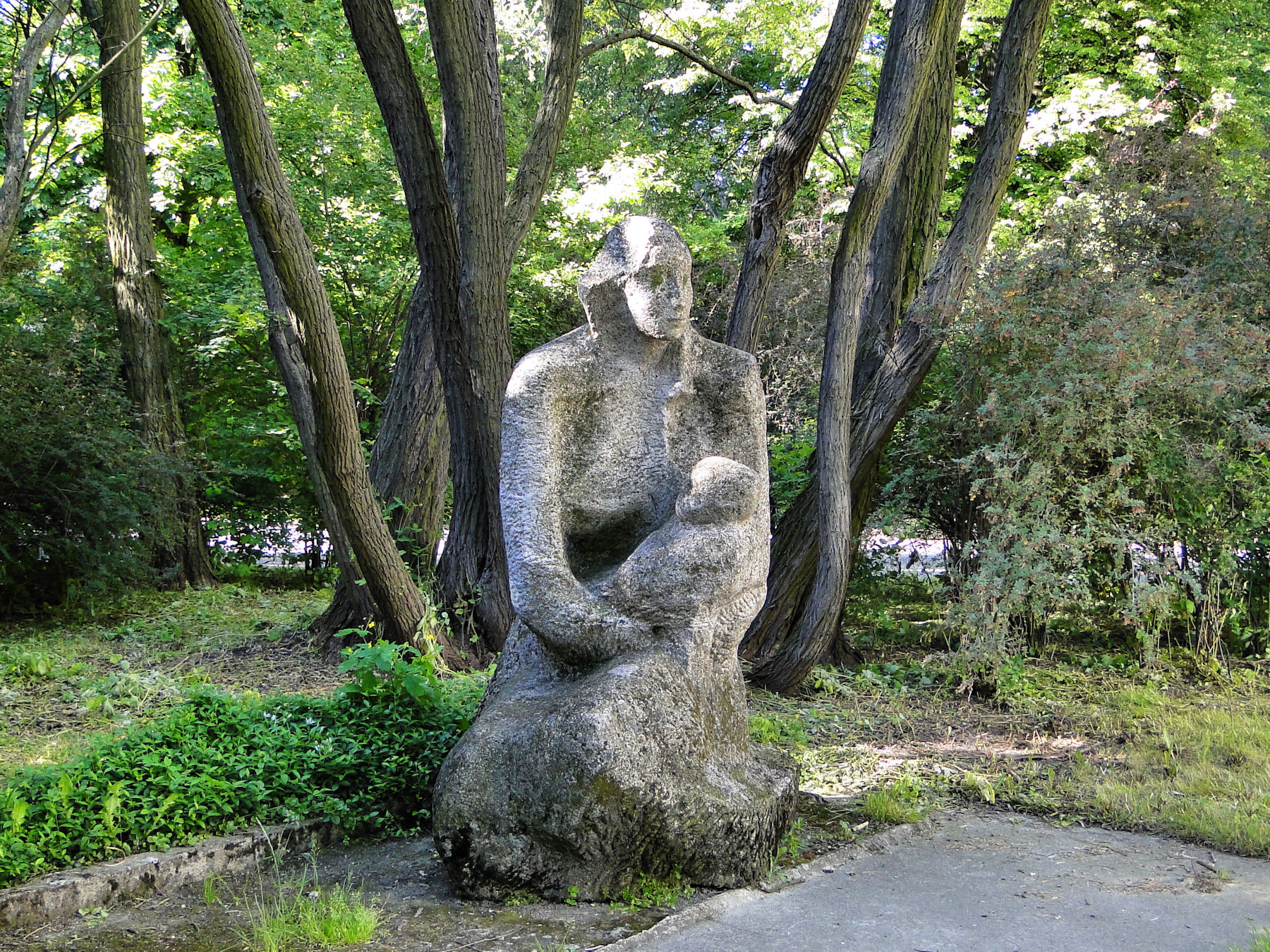
Sculpture Motherhood.

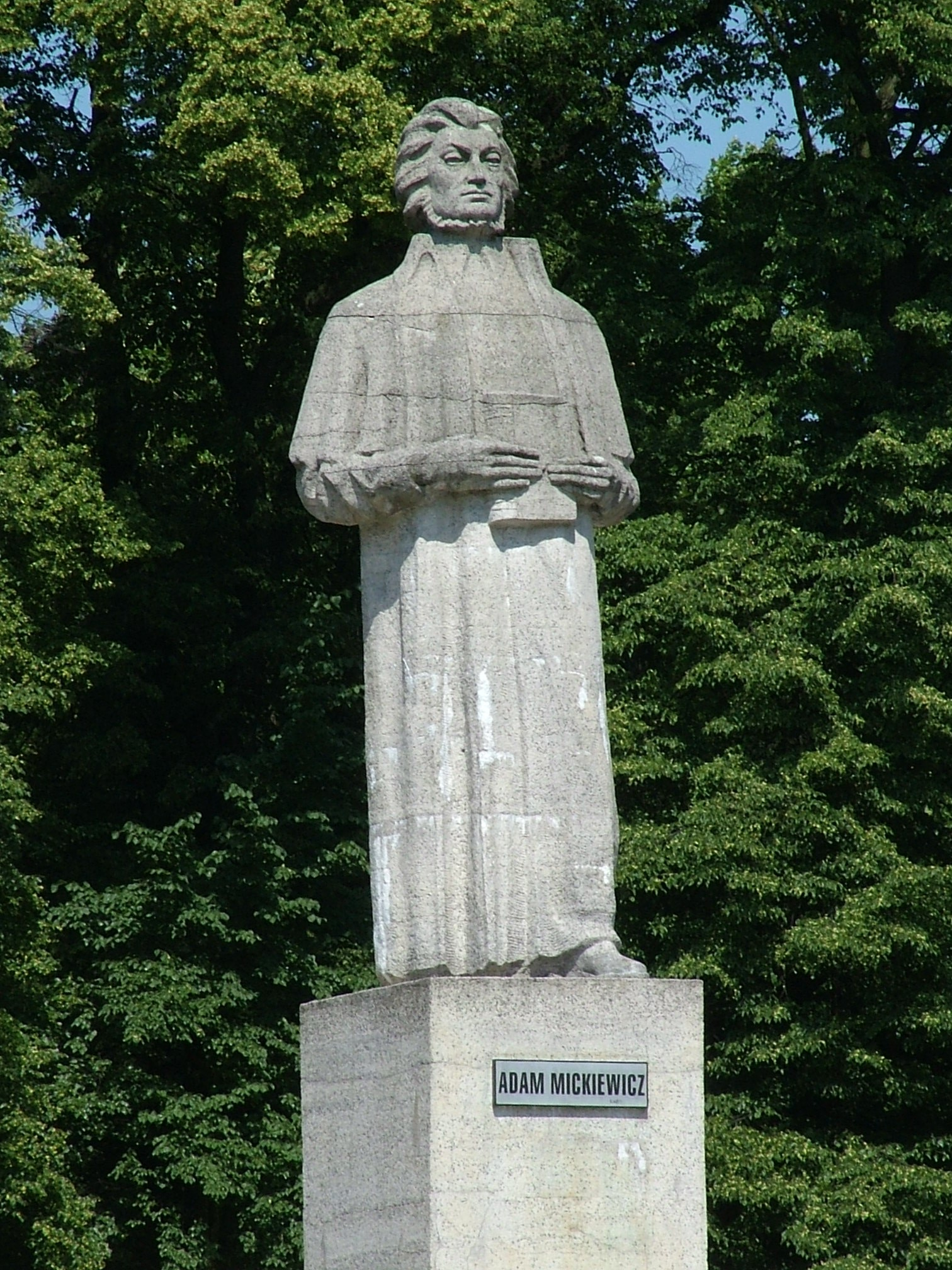
Adam Mickiewicz Monument.

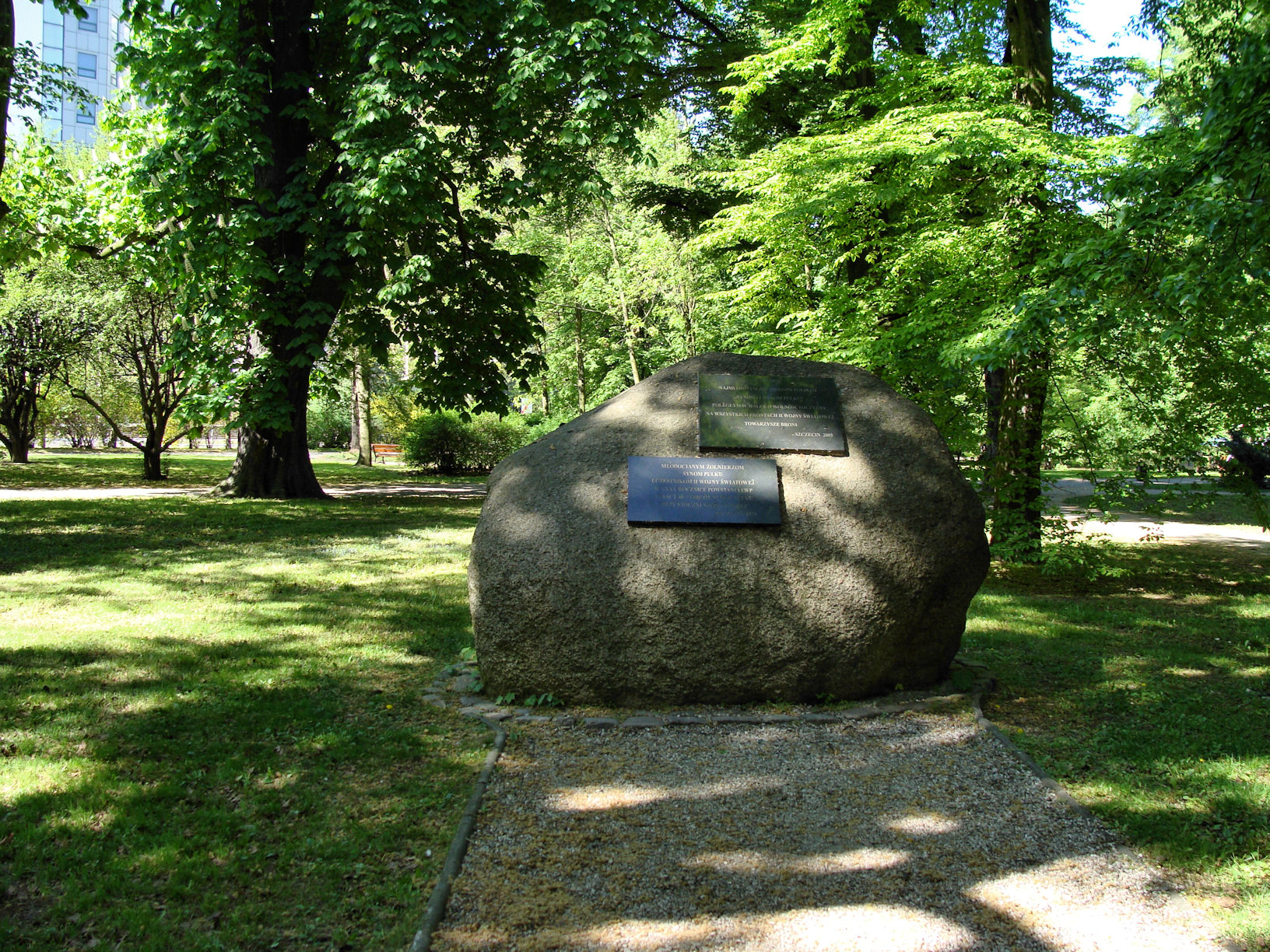
A rock with a plaque dedicated to child camp followers.

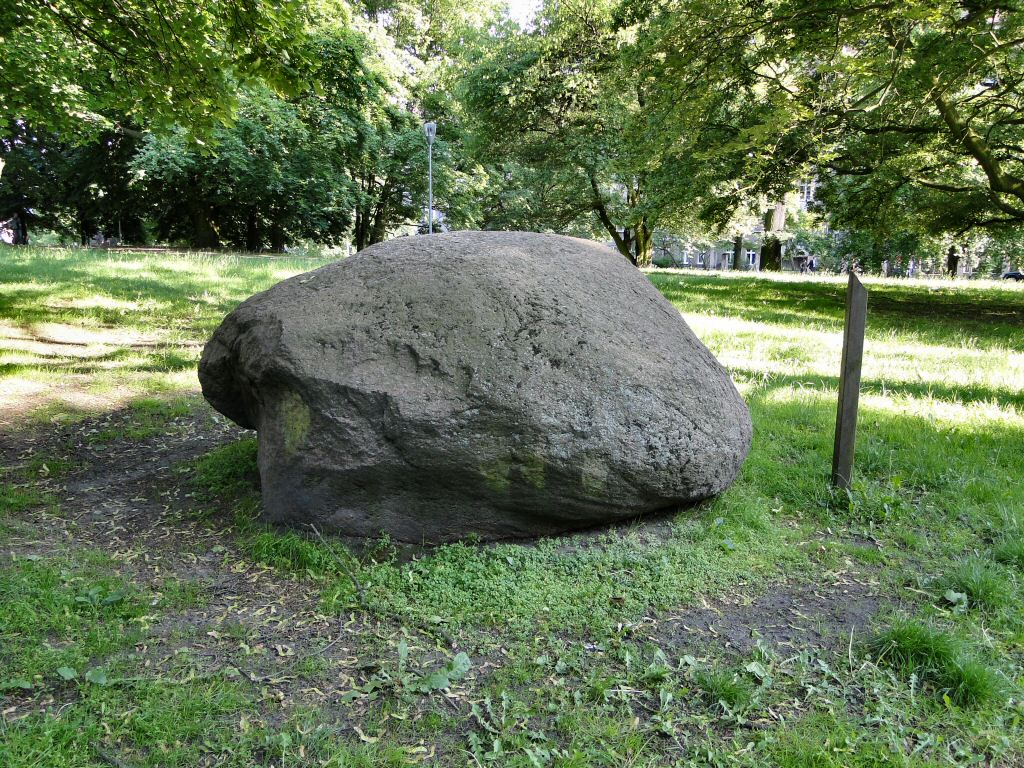
A natural monument in form of a rock Adam.

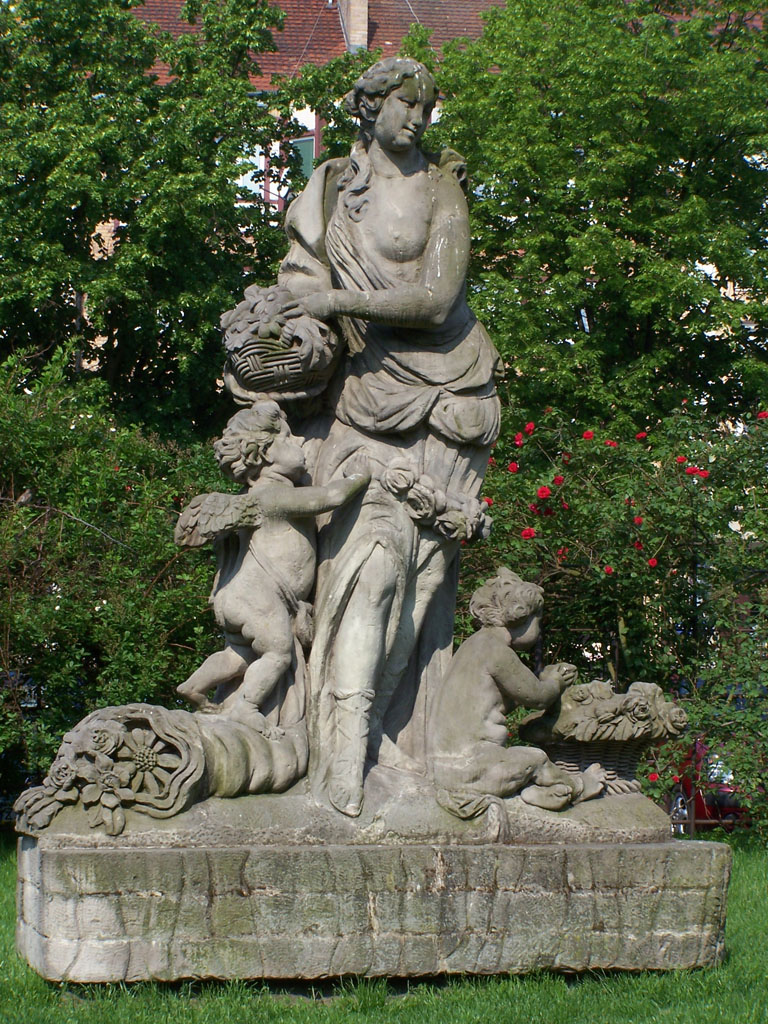
The Statue of Flora, which formerly stood in the park.
