= Equestrian statue of Frederick III =

Former statue in Szczecin, Poland

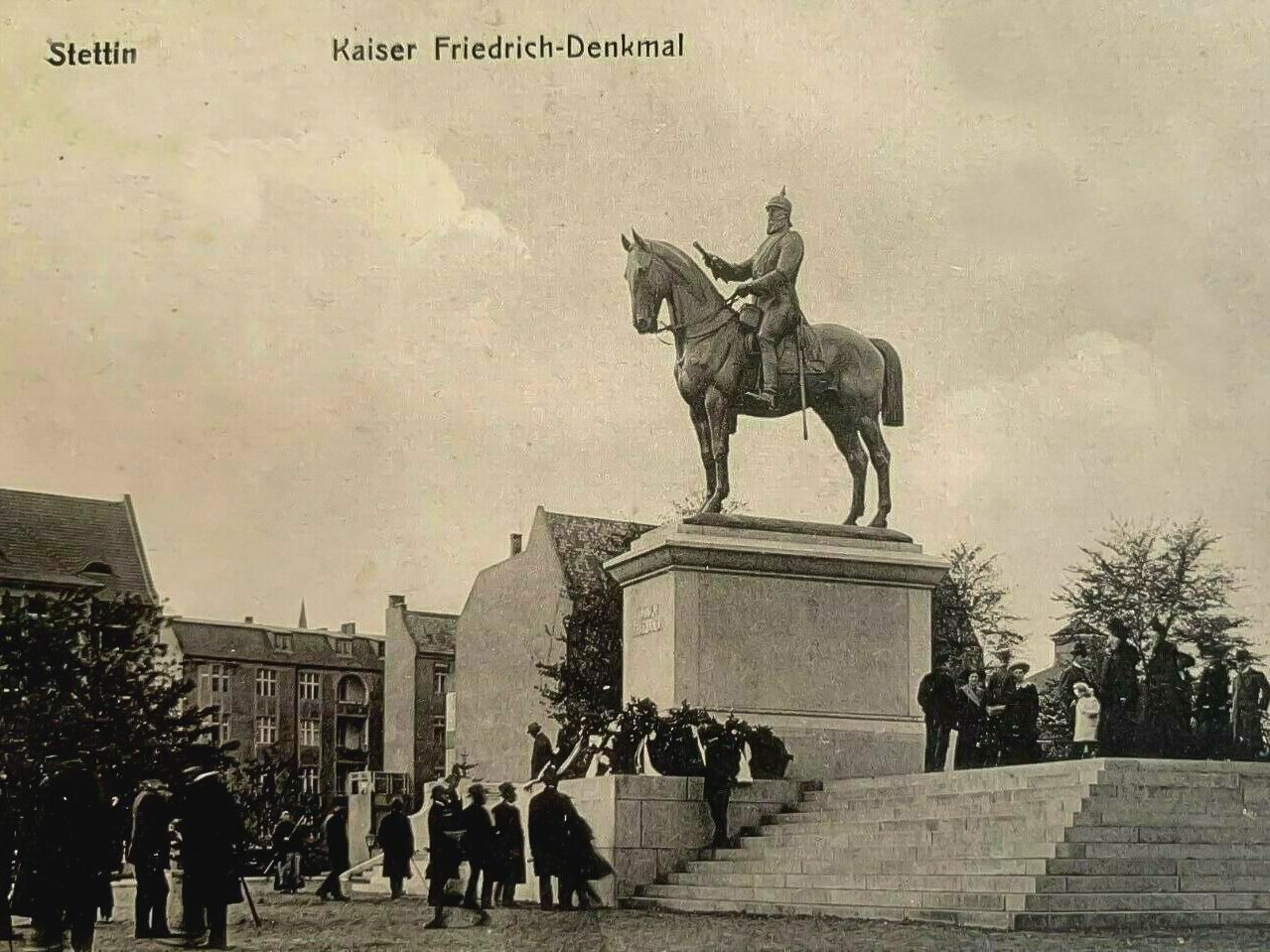
- The statue in 1913.
- Interactive map of Equestrian statue of Frederick III
- Location: Mickiewicz Square, Szczecin, Poland
- Coordinates: 53°25′52.0″N 14°33′42.33″E
- Designer: Ludwig Manzel
- Type: Equestrian statue
- Material: Bronze
- Opening date: 1913
- Dedicated to: Frederick III
- Dismantled date: 1942

The equestrian statue of Frederick III (German: Reiterstandbild Friedrich III; Polish: Pomnik konny Fryderyka III) was a neoclassical monument in Szczecin, Poland, placed at the current Adam Mickiewicz Square, at the southwestern end of the Stefan Żeromski Park. It was a bronze equestrian statue of Frederick III, the King of Prussia from 1831 to 1888, and the Emperor of Germany in 1888. The monument was designed by Ludwig Manzel, unveiled in 1913, and removed and subsequently destroyed in 1942. Currently, since 1960, the statue of Adam Mickiewicz stands in its place.

== History ==
The monument was dedicated to Frederick III, the King of Prussia from 1831 to 1888, and the Emperor of Germany in 1888. It was designed by Ludwig Manzel, and unveiled in 1913. It was placed at the current Adam Mickiewicz Square, at the southwestern end of the Stefan Żeromski Park. The sculpture was removed in 1942, and subsequently melted down for materials used by the military. In 1960, at its former location was unveiled the statue of Adam Mickiewicz, designed by Sławomir Lewiński.

== Characteristics ==
The monument features a bronze statue of Frederick III, sitting on a horse, while wearing a military uniform and the Pickelhaube helmet. It was placed on a stone neoclassical pedestal, inscribed with the text "Kaiser Friedrich", which translated from German to "Emperor Frederick". Two rows of stairs led to the pedestal, descending towards the square.
