= Stanisław Nadratowski Park =

Urban park in Szczecin, Poland

- Interactive map of Stanisław Nadratowski Park
- Type: Urban park
- Location: Downtown, Szczecin, Poland
- Coordinates: 53°26′12.13″N 14°34′00.27″E
- Created: 1910

Stanisław Nadratowski Park (Polish pronunciation: [staˈɲi.swaf na.draˈtɔf.ski]; Polish: Park im. Stanisława Nadratowskiego) is an urban park in Szczecin, Poland, located within the neighbourhood of Drzetowo-Grabowo in the Downtown district. It is placed between Malczewskiego, Kazimierza, Plater, and Parkowa Streets. The park was established in 1910, in place of the northern extension of the former Grabowo Cemetery, which was created in 1846.

== Name ==
The park is named after Stanisław Nadratowski (1950–1970), a student and self-declared pacifist drafted into military, who was fatally shot in unknown circumstances during the 1970 protests in Szczecin.

== History ==
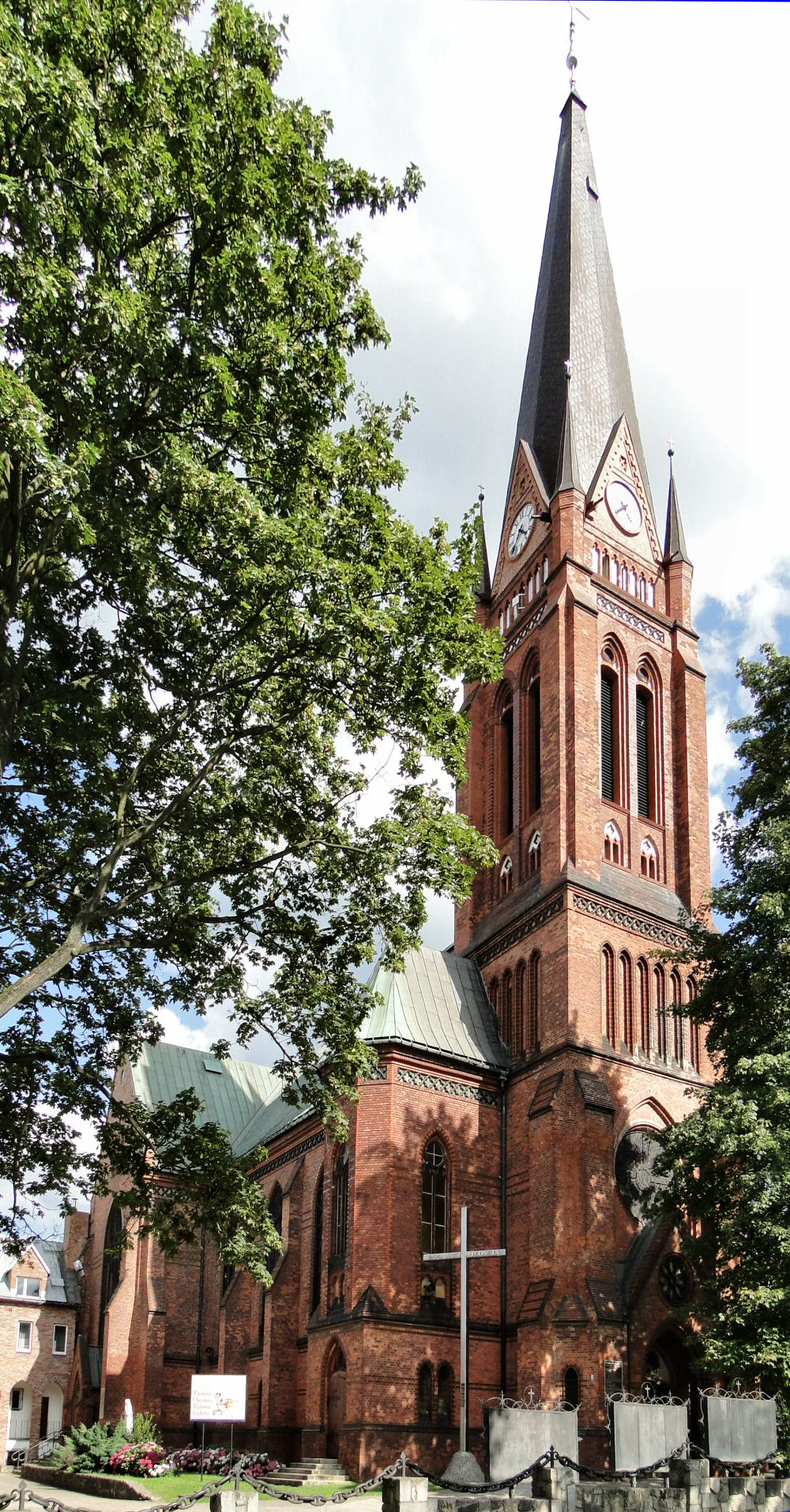
The St. Stanislaus Kostka Church, built next to the park in 1890.

In 1846, an extension of the Grabowo Cemetery was opened to the north of Malczewskiego Street, in a form of a rectangle with the length of 200 m (656.2 ft.), and the width of 80 m (262.5 ft.). It was placed between buildings at the current Malczewskiego, Kazimierza, Plater, and Parkowa Streets. Between 1888 and 1890, the St. Stanislaus Kostka Church, then known as the Church of Peace), was constructed to the north of the cemetery.

At the end of the 19th century, the Grabowo Cemetery became full, and a portion of its graves detiorated and was overgrown by nature. Most of the gravestones were removed from the cementry in 1910, and the area was transformed into a park, known as the Grabowo Gardens (now Stefan Żeromski Park). The graves themselves were never exhumed. The area to the north of Malczewskiego Street became a separate park, now known as Stanisław Nadratowski Park. It was renovated in 2017.

== Characteristics ==
The park has a form a rectangle attached to Malczewskiego Street, and placed between buildings at Malczewskiego, Kazimierza, Plater, and Parkowa Streets. It borders the Stefan Żeromski Park to the south. The Stanislaus Kostka Church, a Gothic Revival Roman Catholic parish church, borders the park to the north.
