= Łęgi, Szczecin =

Neighbourhood of Szczecin, Poland

Łęgi
- Neighbourhood
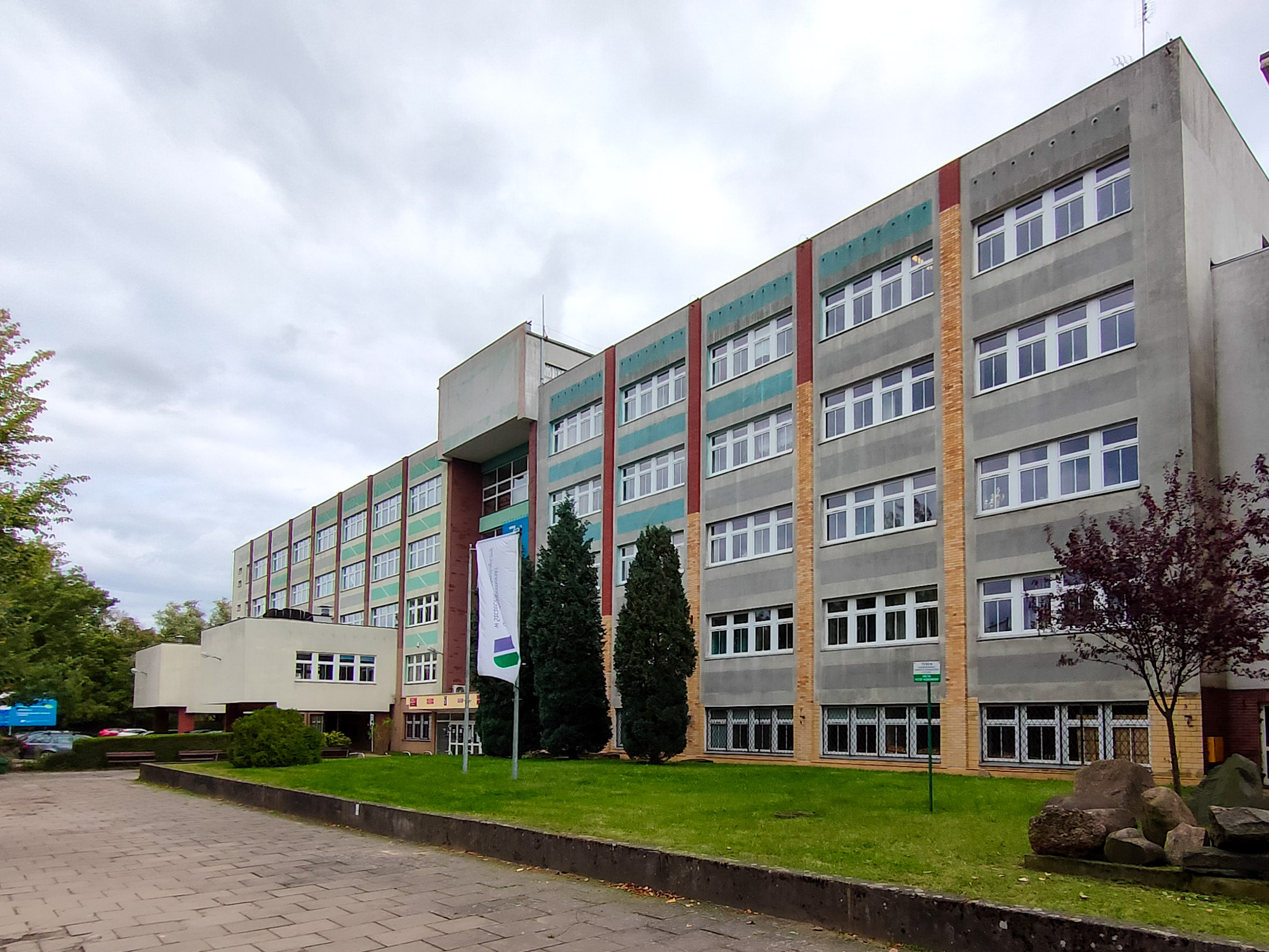
- The Faculty of Food Sciences and Fisheries of the West Pomeranian University of Technology.
- Interactive map of Łęgi
- Coordinates: 53.444321°N 14.565269°E
- Country: Poland
- Voivodeship: West Pomeranian
- City and county: Szczecin
- District: Downtown
- Administrative neighbourhoods: Drzetowo-Grabowo; Niebuszewo-Bolinko
- Time zone: UTC+1 (CET)
  - Summer (DST): UTC+2 (CEST)
- Area code: +48 91
- Car plates: ZS

Łęgi (Polish: [ˈwɛŋ.ɡʲi]; German until 1945: Grüne Wiese [ˈɡʁyː.nə ˈviː.zə], lit. 'Green Meadow') is a small neighbourhood in Szczecin, Poland, within the Downtown district. It is placed between Kazimierza Królewicza, Pierwszego Maja, and Bożeny Streets, at the boundary of the administrative neighbourhoods of Drzetowo-Grabowo and Niebuszewo-Bolinko. The area features the Faculty of Food Sciences and Fisheries of the West Pomeranian University of Technology, and the Water Factory aquapark.

== History ==
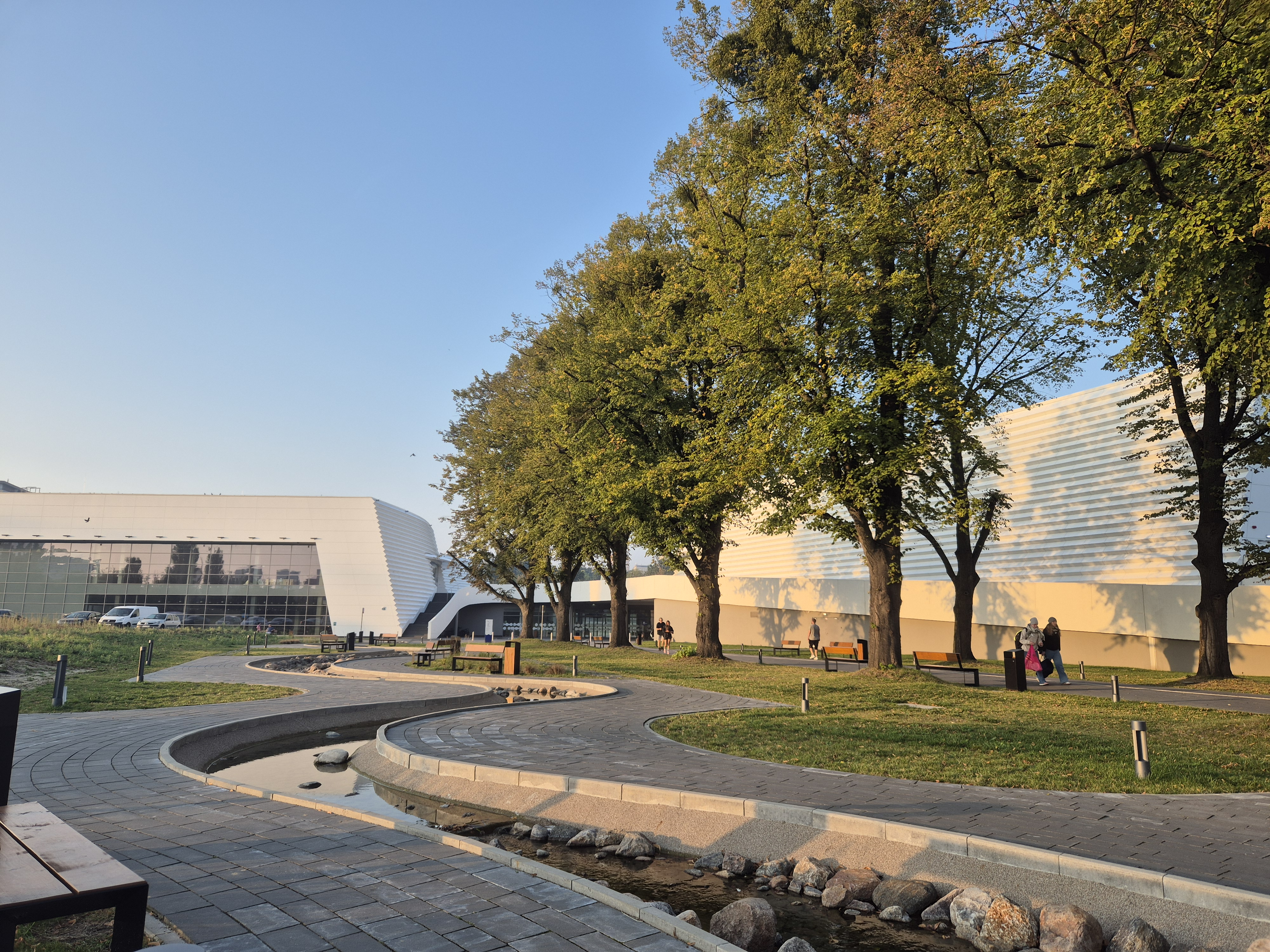
The Water Factory aquapark, opened in 2024.

Prior to the Second World War, the Grüne Wiese public swimming pool complex operated in the area. Its main pool was inspired by the Roman theatres, and the complex features cascading waterfalls.

In 1966, the Faculty of Maritime Fishery of the Agricultural University of Szczecin, was opened in the area, at the 4 Kazimierza Królewicza Street. It was renamed to the Faculty of Maritime Fisheries and Food Technology in 1971, and to the Faculty of Food Sciences and Fisheries in 2002. In 2008, the Agricultural University of Szczecin merged with the Szczecin University of Technology, forming the West Pomeranian University of Technology, under which, the faculty operates to the present day.

In 1973, the Gontyka open-air swimming pool complex was opened in the area. It had three swimming pools, a small food area, and water cascades. It was very popular with local population. Over the years, due to lack of renovations, the complex fell into disrepair, and as it failed to meet the sanitary and safety standards, it was closed in 2000. The abandoned swimming pools were filled in and demolished in 2013, after three children fell into one of them and almost drowned.

The construction of a new water park in the area, named the Water Factory, was announced in 2018. The building was designed in the modernist style by the architecture film TKHolding. Its construction begun in December 2019, and following delays caused by the 2020 COVID-19 pandemic and the 2022 Russian invasion of Ukraine, it opened on 1 July 2024. The project was awarded with the 2023 Construction of the Year award by the Polish Association of Construction Engineers and Technicians, and the 2025 International Architecture & Design Award by the Architecture and Design Community. It was also one of the finalists for the 2024 World Architecture Festival award in the sports category.

== Characteristics ==
Łęgi is a small area located between Kazimierza Królewicza, Pierwszego Maja, and Bożeny Streets. Its divided vertically by Emili Szczanieckiej Street, which forms the border between the administrative neighbourhoods of Drzetowo-Grabowo and Niebuszewo-Bolinko. Its western portion features the building complex of the Faculty of Food Sciences and Fisheries of the West Pomeranian University of Technology. The eastern portion contains the Water Factory aquapark, which features 17 pools, 11 slides, and 16 saunas. It also includes a cultural and educational centre, named the Educatorium (Polish: Edukatorium), which features the exhibition themed around water.
