= Statue of Adam Mickiewicz (Szczecin) =

Monument in Szczecin, Poland

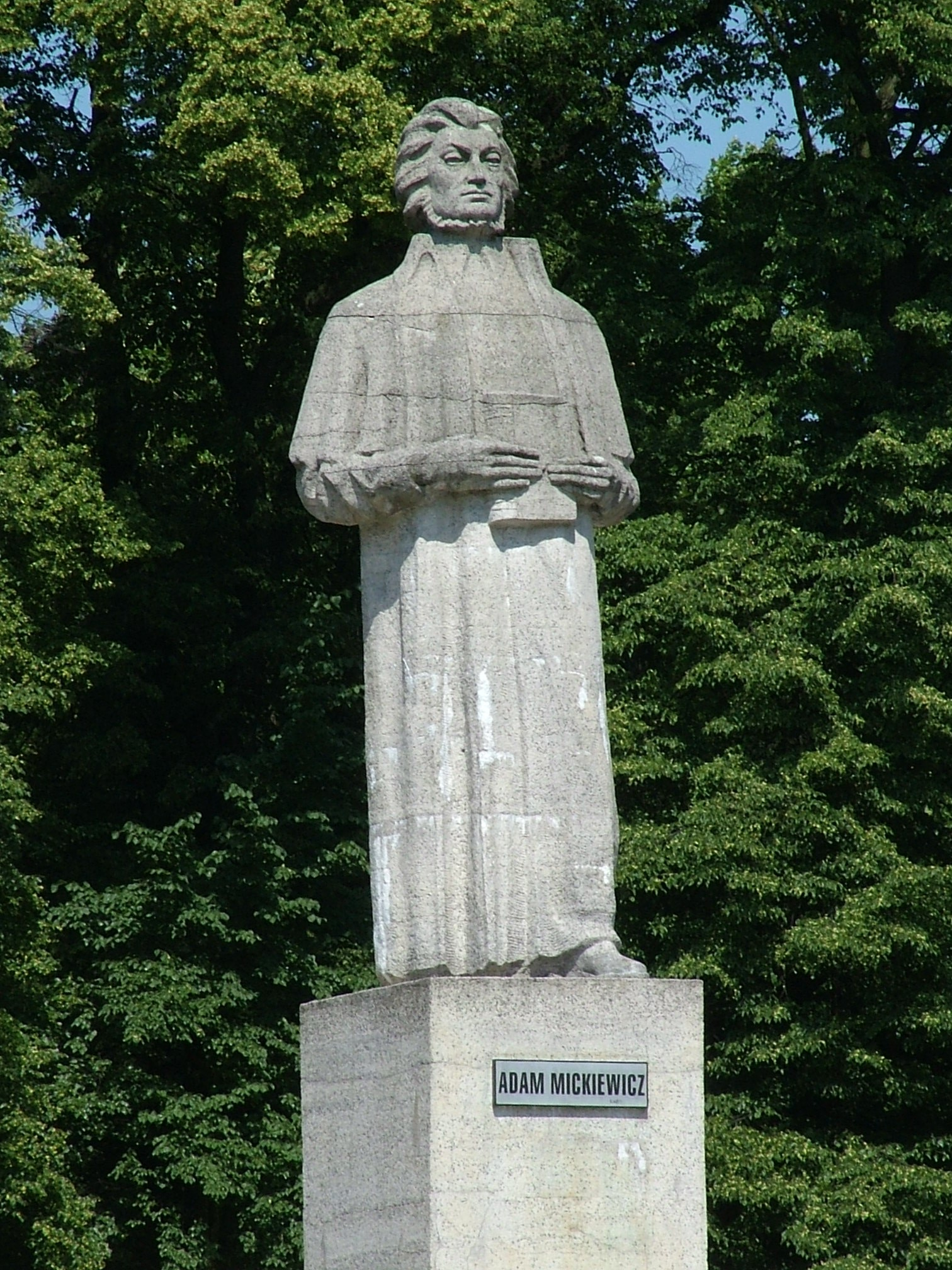
- The Adam Mickiewicz Monument in 2006.
- Interactive map of Statue of Adam Mickiewicz
- Location: Mickiewicz Square, Warsaw, Poland
- Coordinates: 53°25′52.0″N 14°33′42.33″E
- Designer: Sławomir Lewiński
- Type: Statue
- Material: Concrete
- Height: c. 410 cm (statue); c. 575 cm (total)
- Opening date: 3 May 1994
- Dedicated to: Adam Mickiewicz

The statue of Adam Mickiewicz (Polish pronunciation: [mit͡sˈkjɛ.vit͡ʂ]; Polish: Pomnik Adama Mickiewicza) is a monument in Szczecin, Poland, located at the Mickiewicz Square near the Stefan Żeromski Park. It consists of a concrete statue of Adam Mickiewicz, a 19th-century poet, writer, and political activist. It was designed by Sławomir Lewiński and unveiled on 3 May 1960.

== History ==
In 1913, a bronze equestrian statue depicting Frederick III, the Emperor of Germany in 1888, was unveiled in the location of the current monument. It was made by Ludwig Manzel and stood there until 1942, when it was taken down and melted for materials used by the military.

On 3 May 1960, in its place was unveiled the monument by Sławomir Lewiński, dedicated to Adam Mickiewicz. It was made as part of the celebrations of the Millennium of the Polish State.

The monument was renovated in 1993, by its creator's son, Jakub Lewiński.

== Characteristics ==
The monument was placed in the centre of the Adam Mickiewicz Square, near the Stefan Żeromski Park. It consists of a concrete statue depicting Adam Mickiewicz, a 19th-century poet, writer, and political activist. It has a height of around 410 cm and is placed on a pedestal with a height of around 165 cm.
