= Łęgi =

Łęgi may refer to the following places:

- Łęgi, Lublin Voivodeship (east Poland)
- Łęgi, Masovian Voivodeship (east-central Poland)
- Łęgi, Opole Voivodeship (south-west Poland)
- Łęgi, Police County in West Pomeranian Voivodeship (north-west Poland)
- Łęgi, Świdwin County in West Pomeranian Voivodeship (north-west Poland)
- Łęgi, Szczecin, a neighbourhood of Szczecin, West Pomeranian Voivodeship (north-west Poland)
