= Water Factory =

Water park in Warsaw

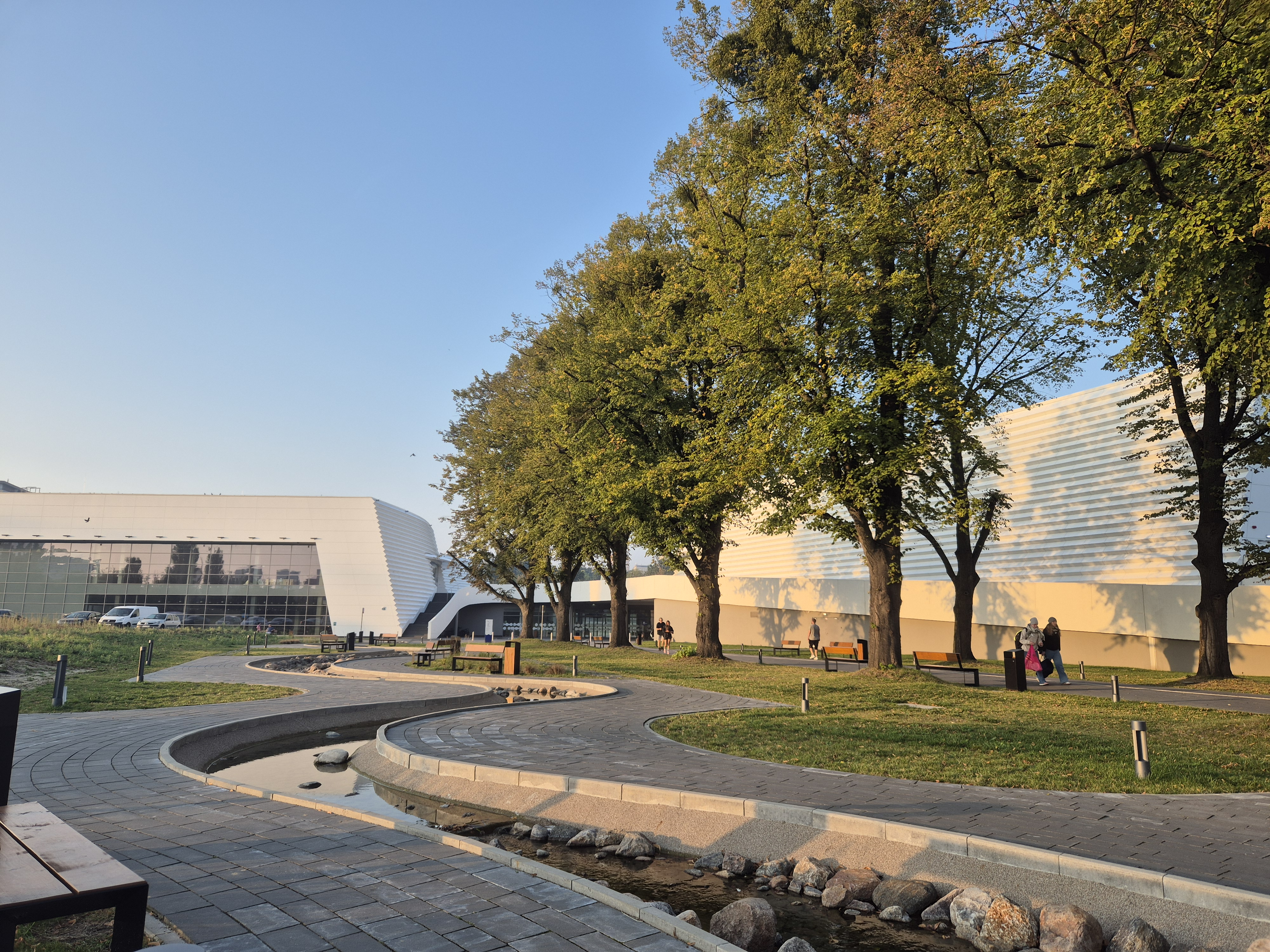
- The main entrance in 2024.
- Interactive map of Water Factory
- Location: 41 Pierwszego Maja Street, Drzetowo-Grabowo, Szczecin, Poland
- Coordinates: 53.444693°N 14.566883°E
- Owner: Szczecin
- Operated by: Fabryka Wody Sp. z o.o.
- Opened: 1 June 2024
- Area: 13,000 m^{2}
- Pools: 17 pools
- Water slides: 11 water slides
- Children's areas: 3 children's areas
- Saunas: 16 saunas
- Website: fabrykawody.eu

The Water Factory (Polish: Fabryka Wody), also known as the Water Factory–New Gontynka, (Polish pronunciation: [ɡɔnˈtɘ̟ŋ.ka]; Polish: Fabryka Wody – Nowa Gontynka), is a modernist water park and science museum in Szczecin, Poland, located at 41 Pierwszego Maja Street, within the administrative neighbourhood of Drzetowo-Grabowo in the Downtown district. The complex features 17 swimming pools, 11 water slides, and 16 saunas, and has an area of 13,000 m^{2} It also includes a science museum, named the Educatorium (Polish: Edukatorium), with an area of around 4,610 m^{2}, which features the exhibition themed around water. The building was designed by the architecture firm TKHolding, and opened on 1 June 2024. Previously, the area featured the Grüne Wiese (lit. from German: 'Green Meadow') public swimming pool complex, which operated there prior to the Second World War, and the Gontyka outdoor swimming pool complex, which operated from 1973 to 2000.

== History ==
Prior to the Second World War, the Grüne Wiese (German: [ˈɡʁyː.nə ˈviː.zə], lit. 'Green Meadow') public swimming pool complex operated in the area. Its main pool was inspired by the Roman theatres, and the complex featured cascading waterfalls.

In 1973, the Gontyka (Polish: [ɡɔnˈtɘ̟ŋ.ka]) outdoor swimming pool complex was opened in its place. It had three swimming pools, a small food area, and water cascades. It was very popular with local population. Over the years, due to lack of renovations, the complex fell into disrepair, and as it failed to meet the sanitary and safety standards, it was closed in 2000. The abandoned swimming pools were filled in and demolished in 2013, after three children fell into one of them and almost drowned.

The construction of a new water park in the area, named the Water Factory, was announced in 2018. The building was designed in the modernist style by the architecture film TKHolding based in Ruda Śląska, Poland. Its construction begun in December 2019, and following delays caused by the 2020 COVID-19 pandemic and the 2022 Russian invasion of Ukraine, it opened on 1 July 2024, on the Children's Day. Its construction was conducted by companies Alstal Grupa Budowlana and Alstal Real Estate, and cost 349.7 million Polish zloties. The equipment of the exhibit in the science museum, which forms part of the complex, was manufactured by MAE Multimedia Art Education, and cost 25.8 million Polish zloties.

The project was awarded with the 2023 Construction of the Year award by the Polish Association of Construction Engineers and Technicians, and the 2025 International Architecture and Design Award by the Architecture and Design Community. It was also one of the finalists for the 2024 World Architecture Festival award in the sports category.

== Design and amenities ==
The Water Factory is a modernist complex, consisting of two minimalist streamlined buildings, with white façades. They are connected with each other via a glass-covered corridor. The east wing houses the water park. It has 17 swimming pools, with a total area of 2,400 m^{2}, and 11 water slides. It includes a sports pool relaxation area with infinity pool and a bar, heated pools and hot tubs, VIP area, two outdoor pools, lazy river, and children's paddling pools. It also features 16 themed saunas.

The west wing houses a science museum, named the Educatorium (Polish: Edukatorium), with an area of around 4,610 m^{2}. It features the exhibition themed around water, meant to educate about physics, mathematics, geography, biology, chemistry, humanities, and history. It is divided into six areas, dedicated to outer space, climate, ocean, humanity, water in human civilisation, and hydraulic engineering. The entrance to this section of the building is free of charge. It also includes a lecture hall with 49 seats, and a large sculpture hung from the ceiling, depicting a molecule of water.

Both wings are separated by a suspended footbridge cutting across the complex. A small linear park, featuring an alley of linden trees and a small curved water canal, leads to the main entrance. The complex also includes a bowling alley, a climbing wall, a volleyball pitch, an outdoor amphitheatre, and an observation deck on the roof. An ice ring is also available in the winter season. The building can house 2,200 visitors, including 1,200 in the swimming area. It has a total usable floor area of 13,000 m^{2}. The water park operates as a private limited company, owned by the city of Szczecin.
