= N,N'-diacetyllegionaminate synthase =

Identifiers
- EC no.: 2.5.1.101

Databases
- IntEnz: IntEnz view
- BRENDA: BRENDA entry
- ExPASy: NiceZyme view
- KEGG: KEGG entry
- MetaCyc: metabolic pathway
- PRIAM: profile
- PDB structures: RCSB PDB PDBe PDBsum
Search
- PMC: articles
- PubMed: articles
- NCBI: proteins

N,N'-diacetyllegionaminate synthase (EC 2.5.1.101, neuB (gene), legI (gene)) is an enzyme with systematic name phosphoenolpyruvate:2,4-diacetamido-2,4,6-trideoxy-alpha-D-mannopyranose 1-(2-carboxy-2-oxoethyl)transferase. This enzyme catalyses the following chemical reaction

2,4-diacetamido-2,4,6-trideoxy-alpha-D-mannopyranose + phosphoenolpyruvate + H_{2}O $\rightleftharpoons$ N,N'-diacetyllegionaminate + phosphate

This enzyme requires a divalent metal such as Mn^{2+}.
