= French Reformed Church Cemetery =

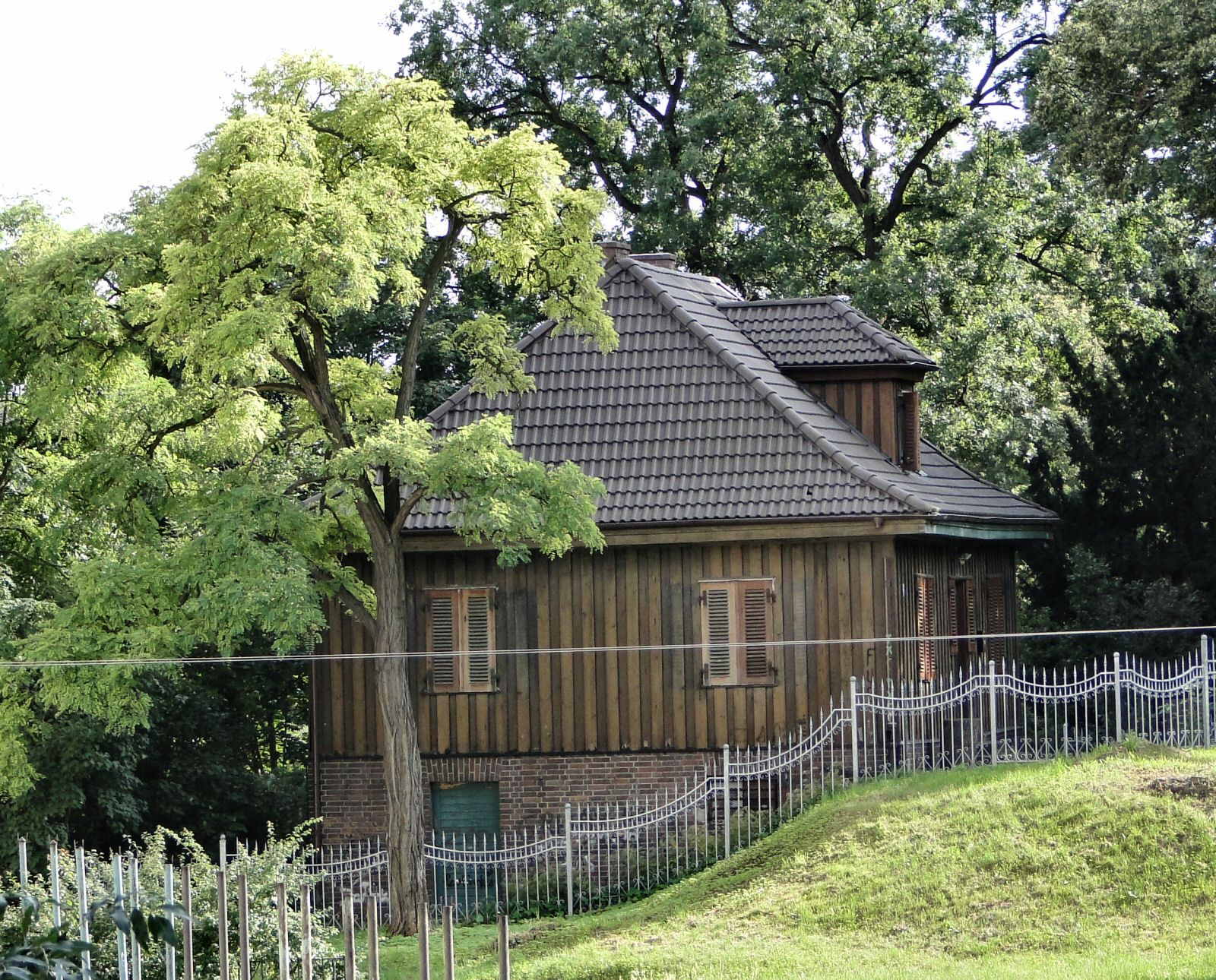
- The former gardener building, the last remaining structure of the cemetery. Photography taken in 2009.
- Interactive map of French Reformed Church Cemetery

Details
- Established: 18th century
- Closed: 1937 (closed); 1965 (demolished)
- Location: Szczecin
- Country: Poland
- Coordinates: 53°25′57.16″N 14°34′05.38″E
- Type: Reformed Christian

The French Reformed Church Cemetery (Note: Polish: Cmentarz francuskiego kościoła reformowanego; German: Französische Gemaide Reformierte Kirchhof; French: Cimetière de l'Église réformée française) was a Reformed Christian cemetery in Szczecin, Poland used by the French community. It was located between current Storrady Street, Wawelska Street, Parkowa Street, and Kapitańska Street, in what now forms part of the Stefan Żeromski Park. The cemetery was founded in the first part of the 18th-century, and remained operational until 1937, and was eventually demolished in 1965.

== History ==
The Reformed Christian cemetery was founded in the first half of the 18th century, by the French community, which begun settling in the city after 1721. It was located between current Storrady Street, Wawelska Street, Parkowa Street, and Kapitańska Street. For many years, it was a burial place for many members of the community, including numerous notable city inhabitants.

In 1928, the cemetery was renovated, and there was constructed a brick chappel and a wooden gardener building. It was closed for burials in 1937.

The chappel was destroyed during the World War II. After 1945, it began being known as Frogville Cemetery (Polish: Cmentarz Żabikowski) among Polish population which settled in the city following the end of the conflict.

The gravestones were cleared from the cemetery in 1965, and it was turned into a part of the Stefan Żeromski Park. Currently, the only historical remain after it is the former gardener building. There are also placed three crosses, pained in the colours of the flag of France, it its commemoration.
