= Grabowo, Szczecin =

Neighbourhood of Szczecin, Poland

Grabowo
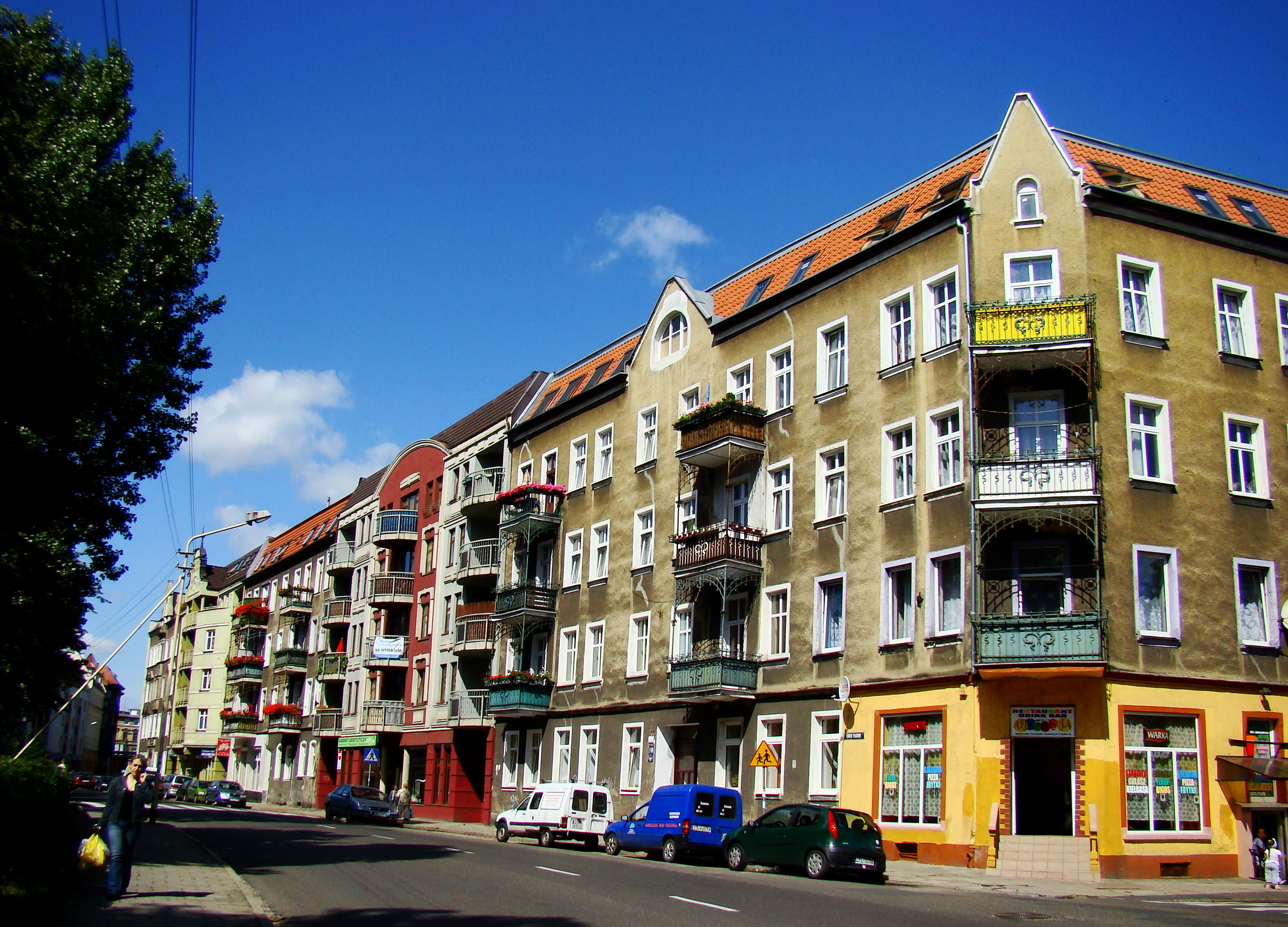
- Plater Street

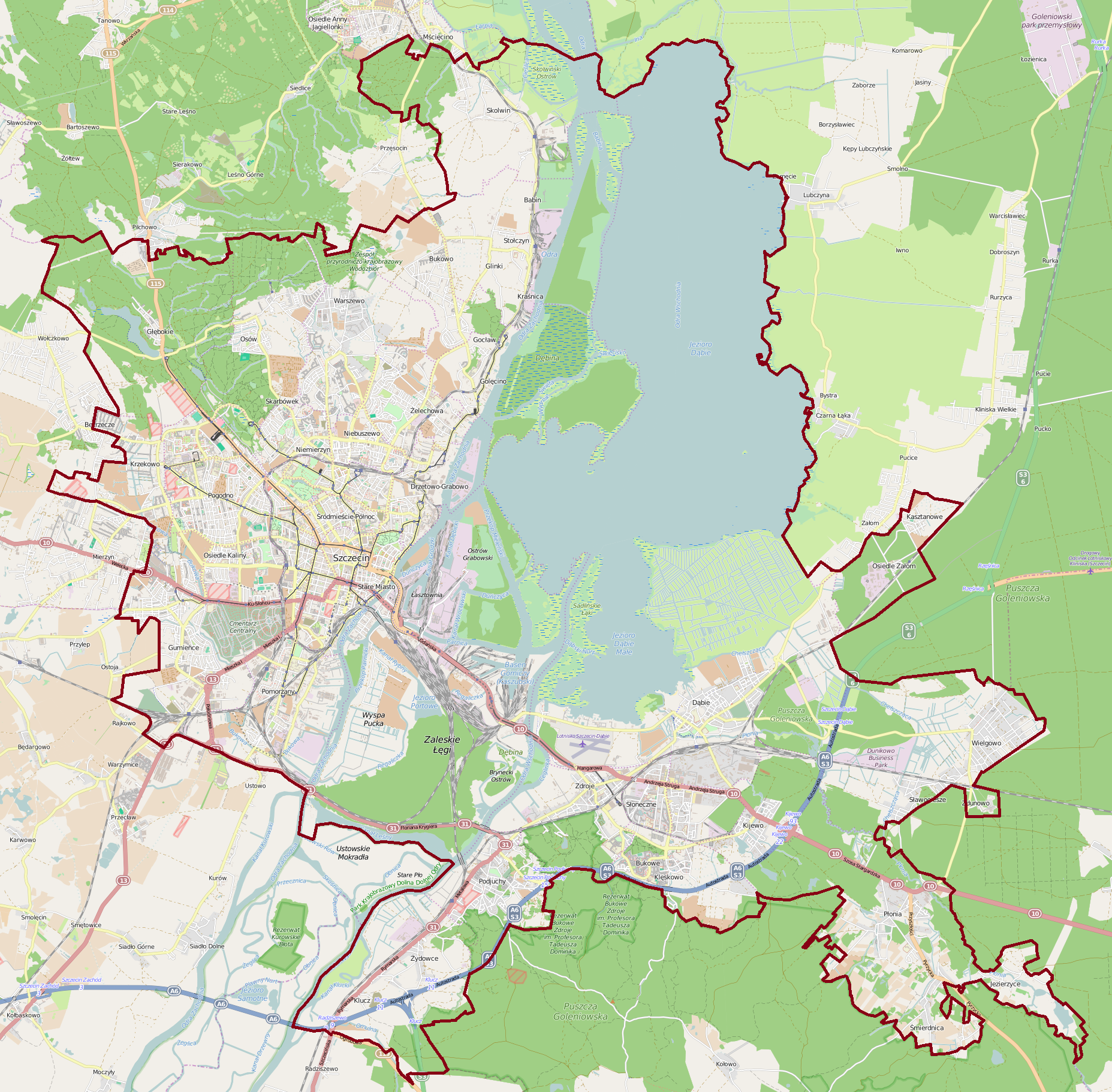
- Location within Szczecin Location within Poland
- Coordinates: 53.4394°N 14.575°E
- Country: Poland
- Voivodeship: West Pomeranian
- County/City: Szczecin
- Neighbourhood: Drzetowo-Grabowo
- Within city limits: 1900
- Time zone: UTC+1 (CET)
  - Summer (DST): UTC+2 (CEST)
- Vehicle registration: ZS
- Primary airport: Solidarity Szczecin–Goleniów Airport

Grabowo is a part and historical municipal neighbourhood of Szczecin, Poland, located in the north-central part of the city. It was merged with another historical neighbourhood (Drzetowo) and has formed present Drzetowo-Grabowo neighbourhood.

== History ==
The area became part of the emerging Polish state under its first ruler Mieszko I around 967, and following Poland's fragmentation it formed part of the Duchy of Pomerania. During the Thirty Years' War, the settlement fell to the Swedish Empire. Later on, it passed to Prussia, and from 1871 to 1945 it was part of Germany, within which it was known as Grabow.
