= Ludwig Manzel =

German sculptor, painter and graphic artist

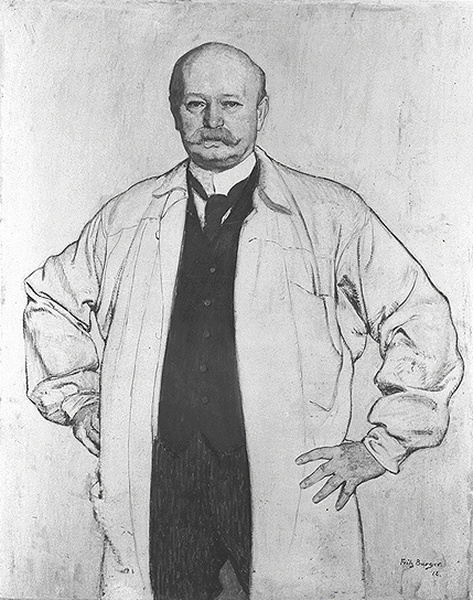
Ludwig Manzel (1912), by Fritz Burger (1877-1916), the art historian.

Karl Ludwig Manzel (3 June 1858, Neu Kosenow – 20 June 1936, Berlin) was a German sculptor, painter and graphic artist.

== Life ==
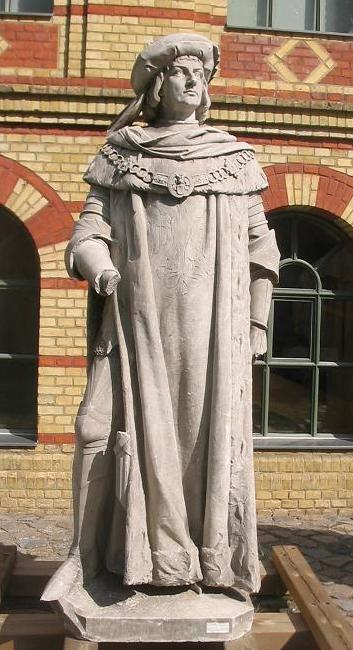
Frederick I from the Siegesallee, now in the Spandau Citadel

His father was a tailor and his mother was a midwife. The family moved twice, first to Boldekow then, in 1867, to Anklam where he attended the Gymnasium. It was there that he first expressed a desire to study art, but this was not supported by his parents. In 1875, at the age of seventeen, he arrived in Berlin, penniless, with the intention of enrolling at the Prussian Academy of Arts.

He supported his education by teaching drawing at a commercial art school and providing illustrations to the magazines Ulk (Joke, or Spoof) and Lustige Blätter (The Funny Papers). Among his teachers at the Academy were Albert Wolff and Fritz Schaper. Under the aegis of a sculptor's association called "Am Wege" (On the Way), he had his first successes and obtained a one-year scholarship to Paris, where he actually remained for three years, working in a major art studio.

=== Successes in Berlin ===
In 1889, he returned to Berlin, became a free-lance artist and developed a standing contract with the Imperial Family to produce busts and reliefs. His true breakthrough came in 1894, when he was commissioned to do figures for the Berlin Cathedral and the Reichstag. In 1895, he became a member of the Academy and, the following year, a Professor at the Museum of Applied Arts. In 1903, he succeeded Reinhold Begas as head of the Masters Studio, a position he held until 1925. Perhaps his best-known student was Josef Thorak, one of the "official sculptors" of the Third Reich. He served two terms as President of the Academy; from 1912 to 1915 and from 1918 to 1920. In 1914, he was one of the signatories to the Manifesto of the Ninety-Three, a document supporting Germany's invasion of Belgium.

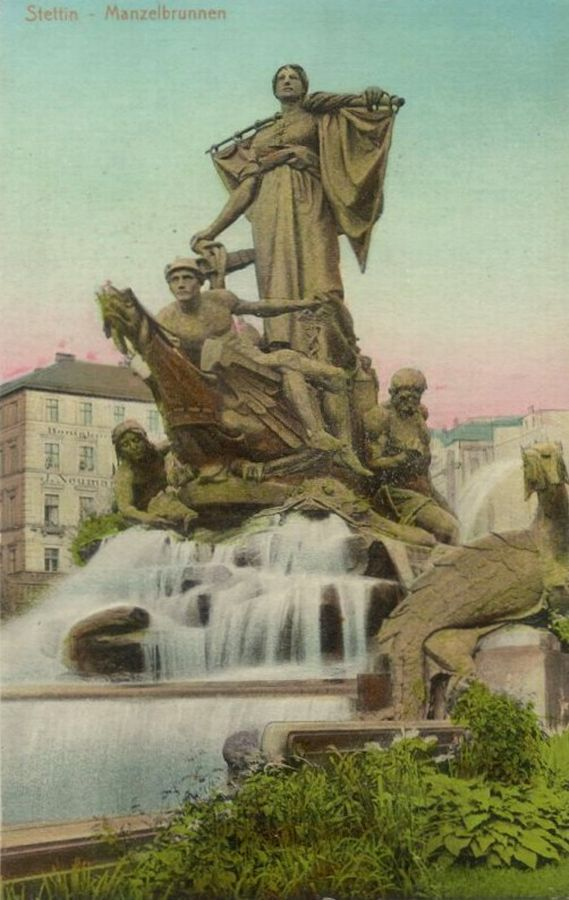
"Manzelbrunnen" (Manzel's Fountain); a postcard from c.1899-1913

He was a friend of both Kaiser Wilhelm II and Georg Wertheim. When the Kaiser renovated an old manor for use as a summer residence in Cadinen, he contracted with Manzel to help modernize the earthenware factory there, as well as produce new Jugendstil designs for pitchers, vases and jars. When the project was completed in 1905, the Wertheim Department Store obtained exclusive rights to sell the new products.

In his final years, he turned to painting, producing altarpieces for several churches in Charlottenburg. One of his last works was a bronze medallion of Joseph Goebbels. His grave at the Stahnsdorf South-Western Cemetery is decorated with a female head he sculpted at an early stage of his career.

== Selected major works ==
- 1894: Figures of the Apostles for the Berlin Cathedral.
- 1898: A figure named "Sedina" (a symbolic embodiment of the city of Stettin), in a fountain which came to be known as the "Manzelbrunnen". It was dismantled and melted for the copper in 1942. The fountain was later reconstructed with an anchor as the centerpiece. In 2012, the Szczecin City Council approved the re-establishment of a Sedina figure there.
- 1900: Group 15 in the Siegesallee (Victory Avenue), consisting of Frederick I, Elector of Brandenburg as the central figure, flanked by side figures of the knight Johannes von Hohenlohe (1370-1412) and the Landeshauptmann Wend von Ileburg.
- 1906: Statue representing "Labor", on the first floor landing of Wertheim's department store, Leipziger Platz.
- 1912-1924: A monumental Christ-relief on the theme "Come unto me, all ye who labor...", with 24 figures. Intended for a Protestant church in Gnesen, it could not be installed because that city was returned to Poland in 1920. Since 1932, it has been part of a grave memorial for F. W. Murnau in the Südwestkirchhof Stahnsdorf, not far from Manzel's own grave.
