= Drzetowo-Grabowo =

- municipal neighborhood
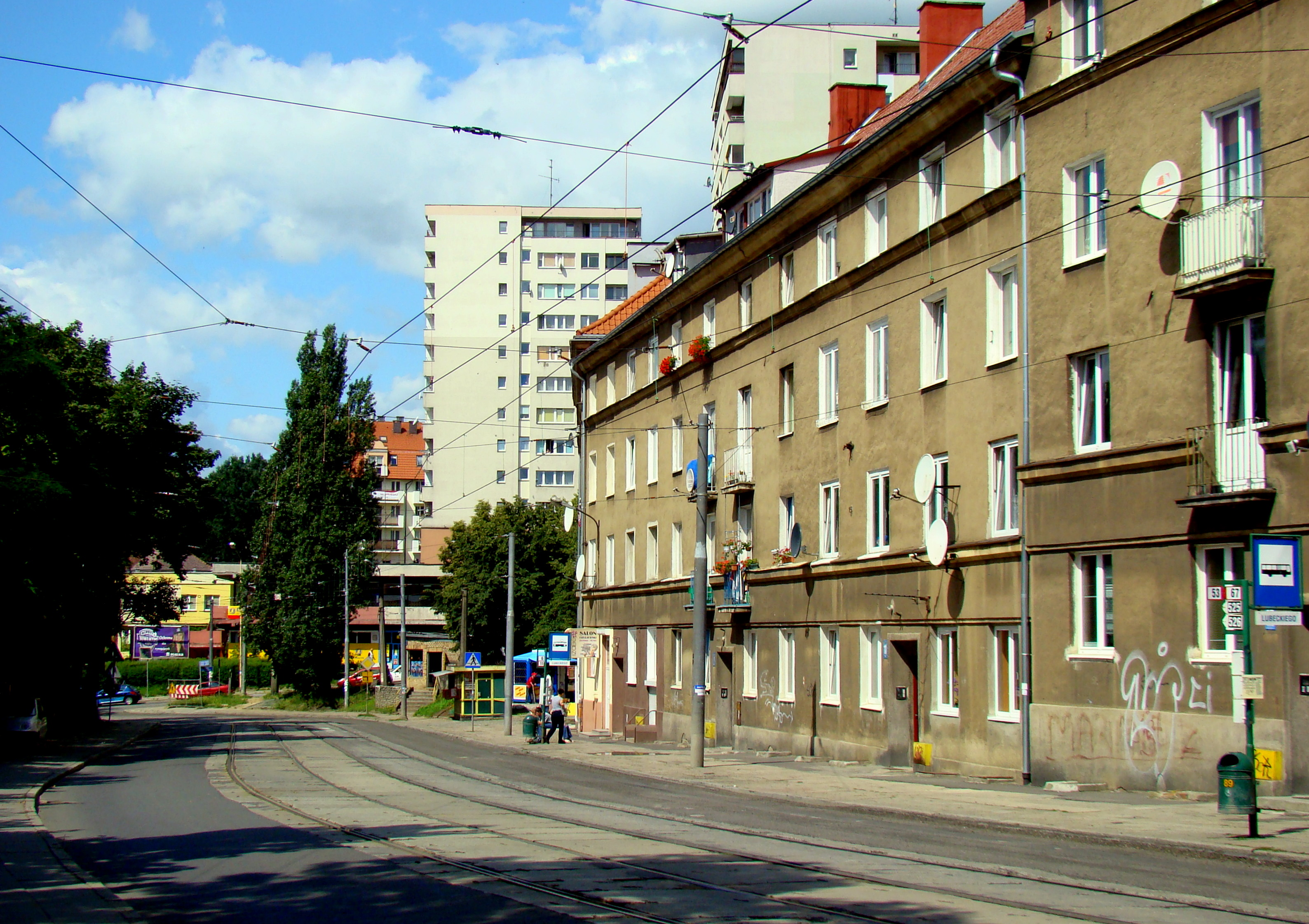
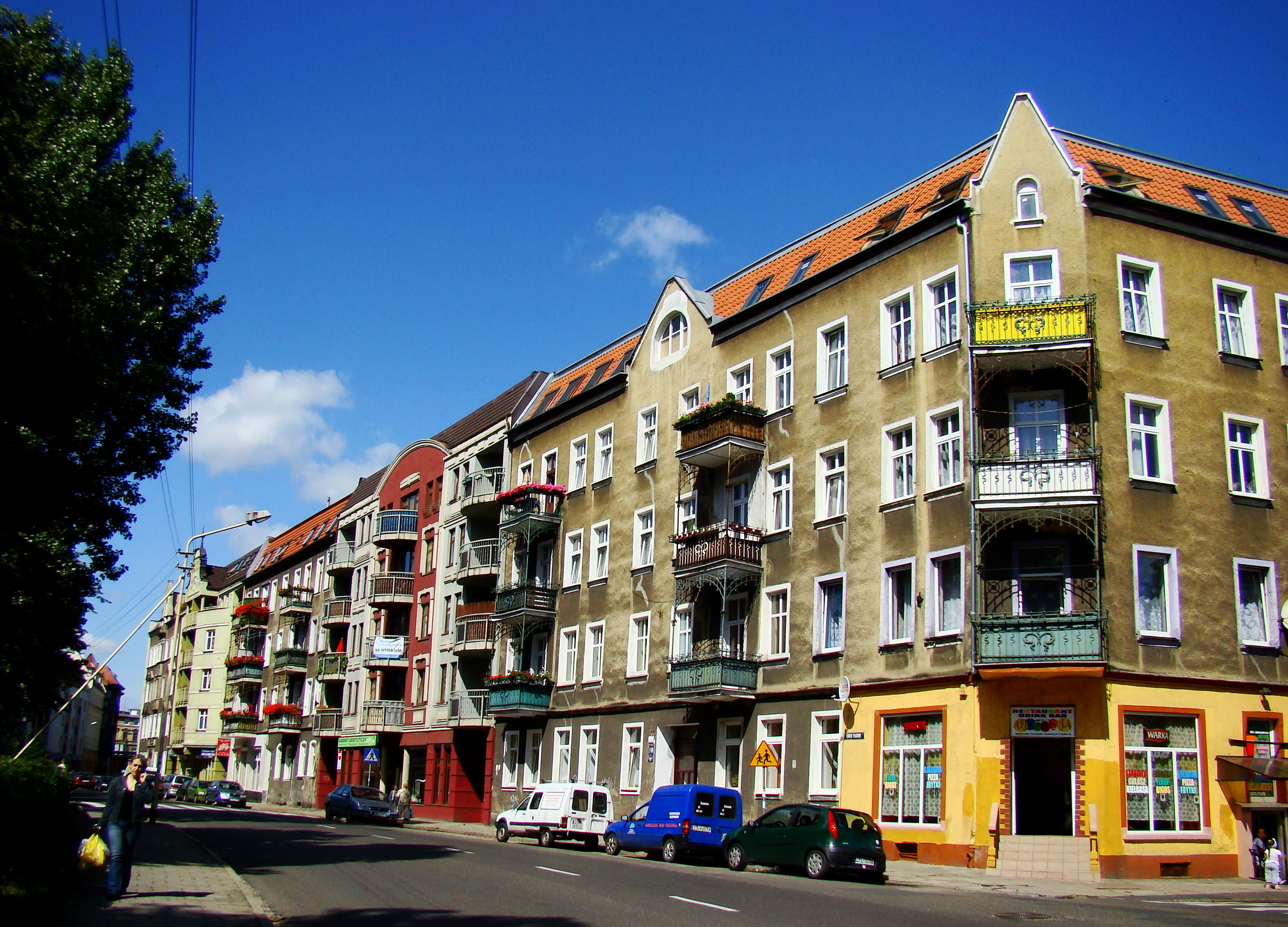
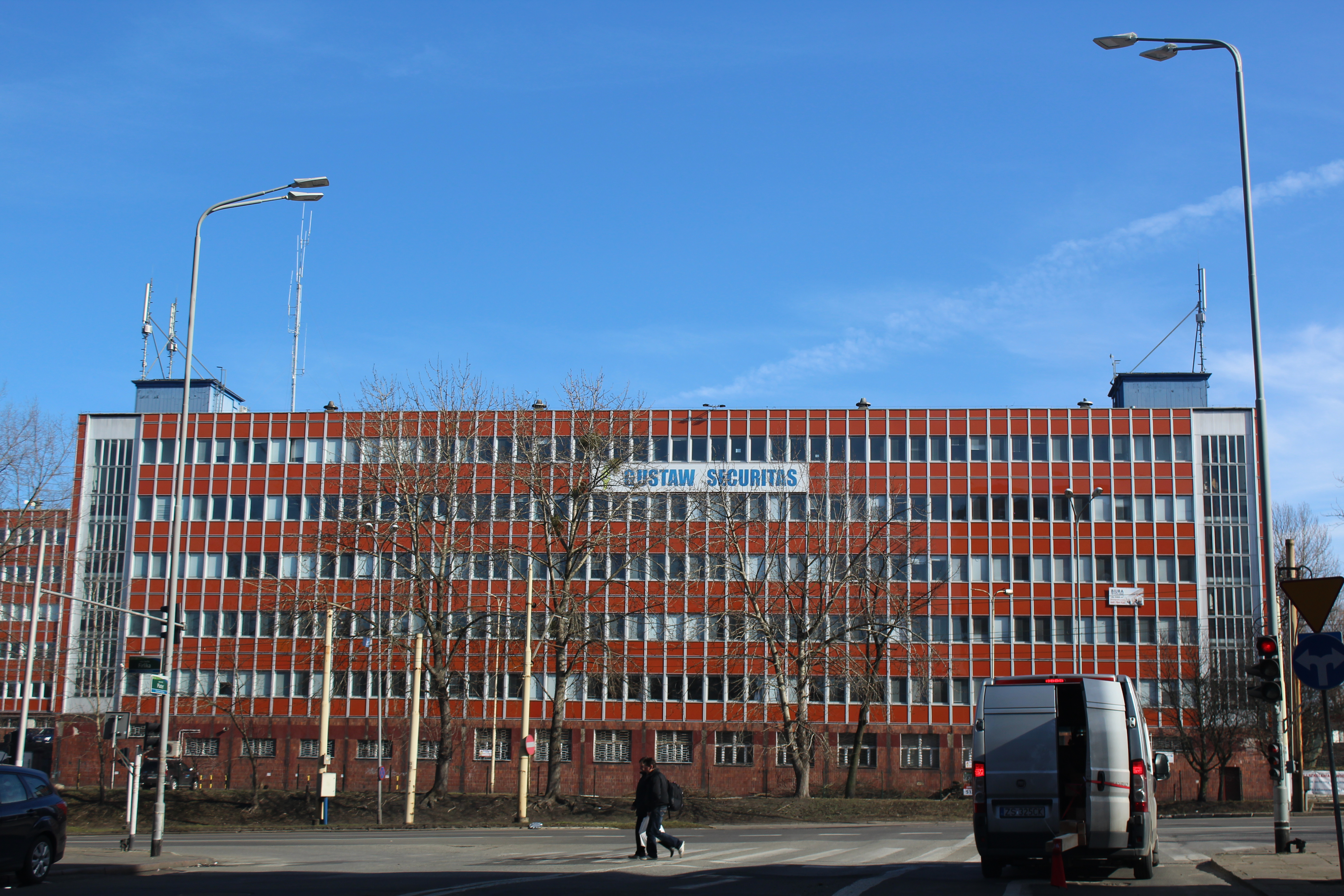
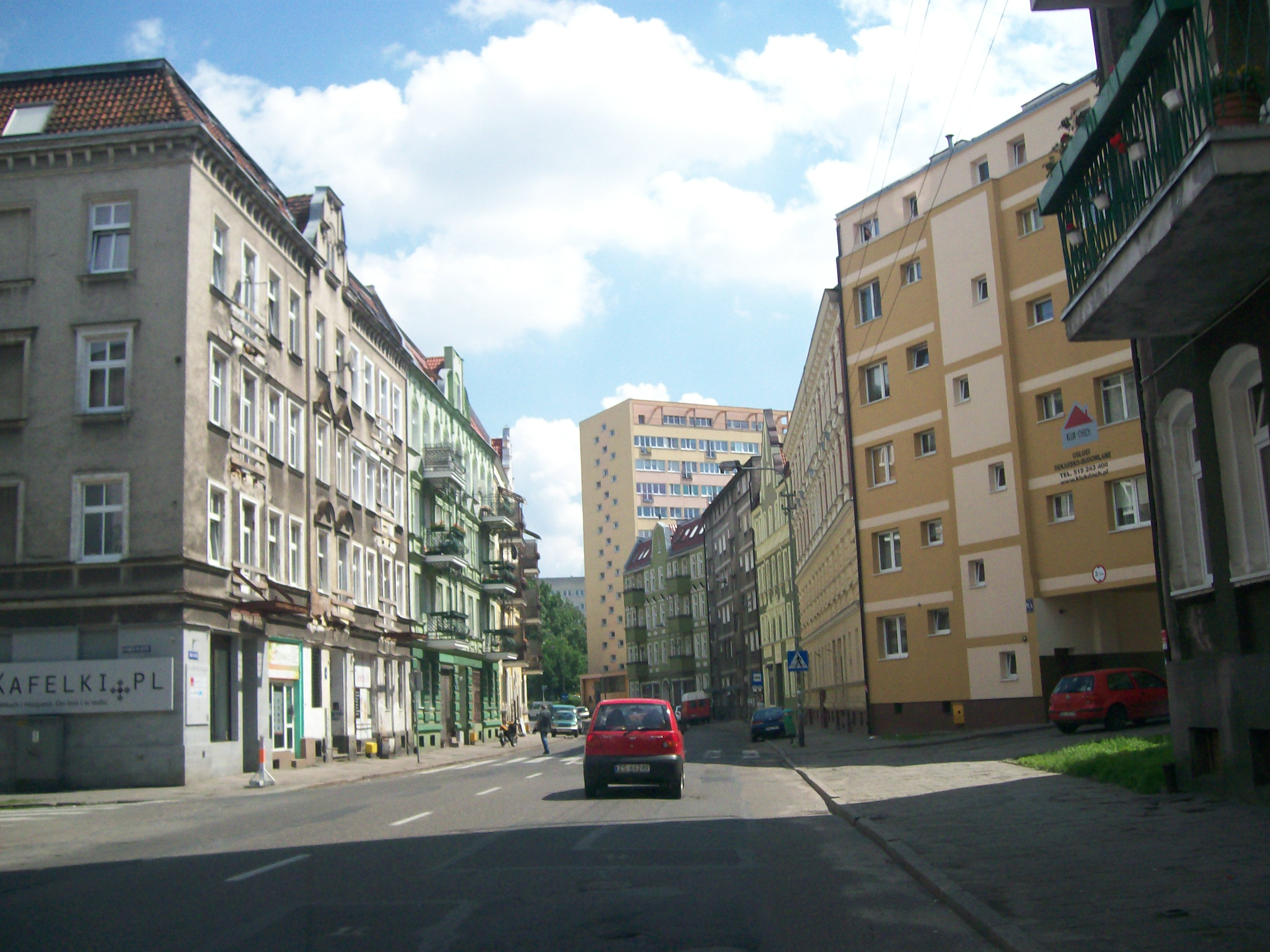
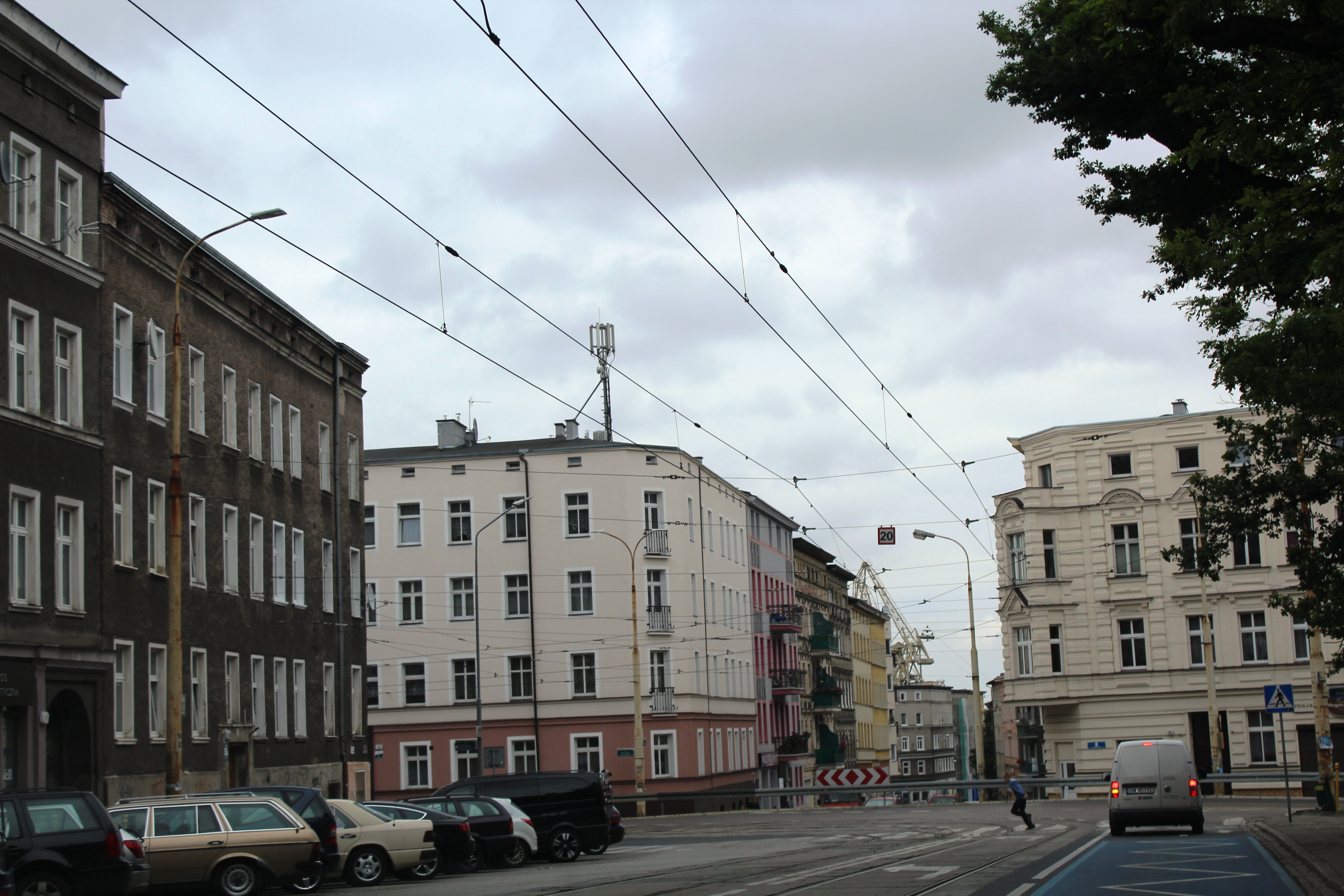
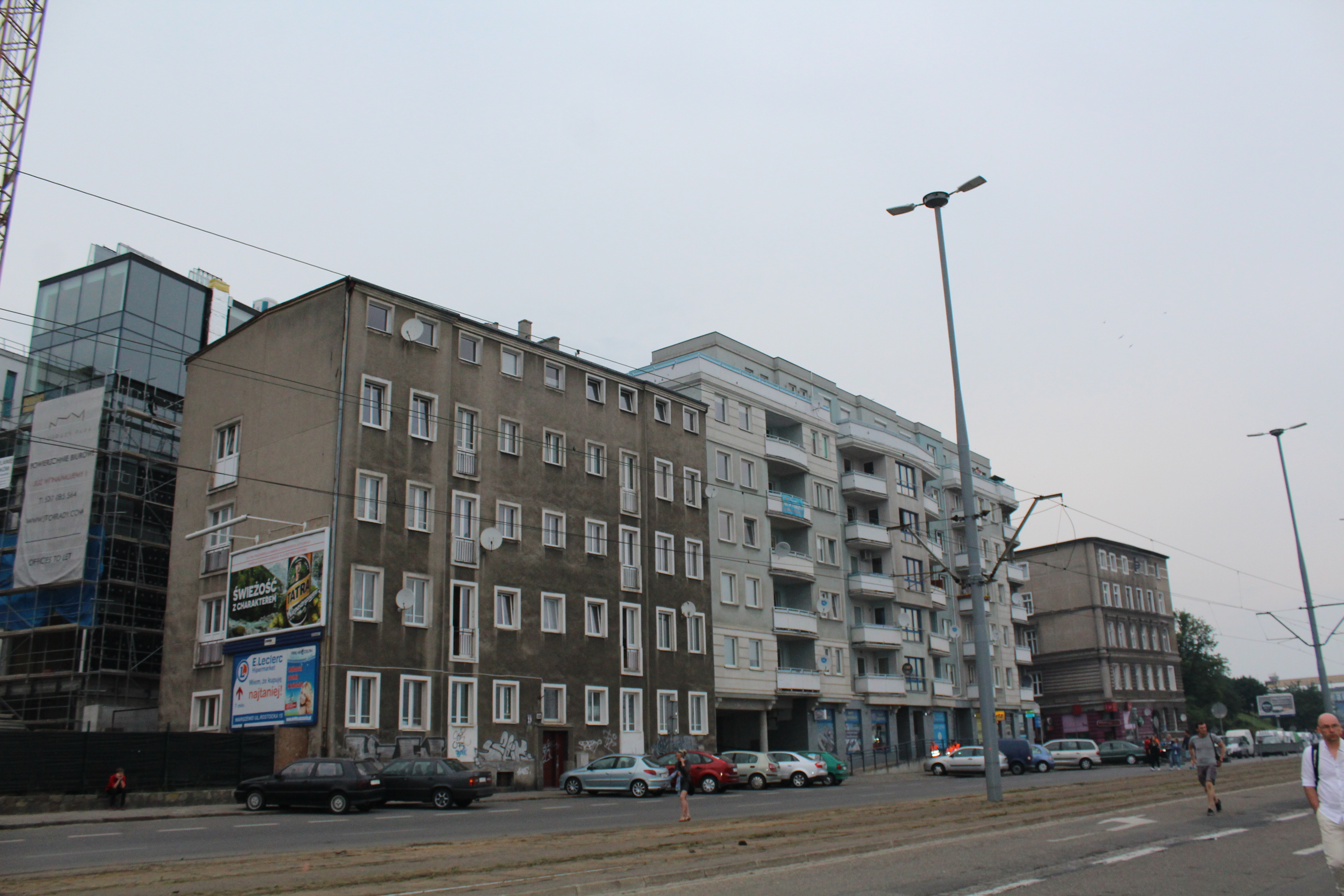

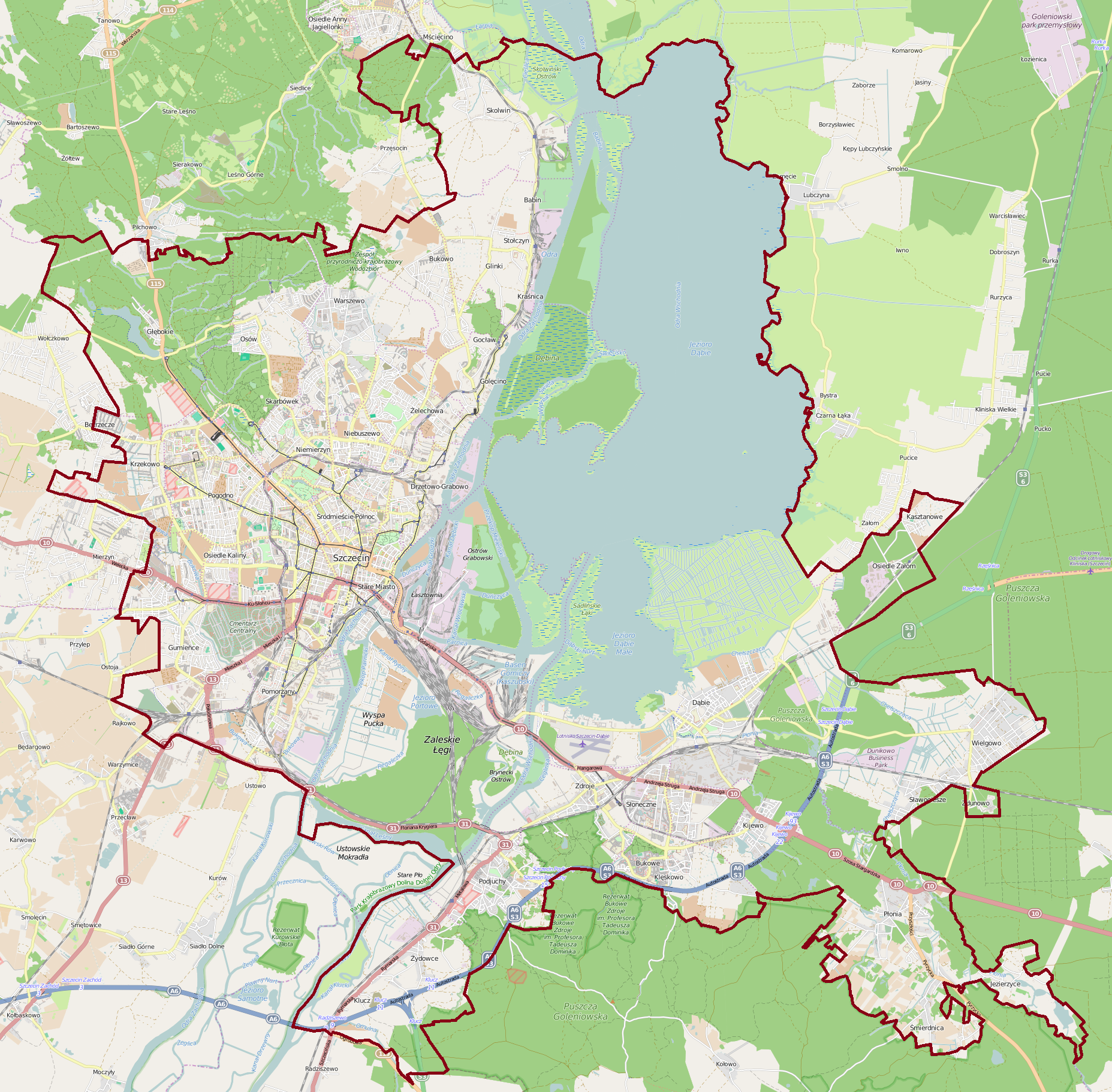
- Location within Szczecin
- Coordinates: 53.4453°N 14.5802°E
- Country: Poland
- Voivodeship: West Pomeranian
- City: Szczecin
- District: Śródmieście
- Established: 1990

Government
  - Body: municipal neighborhood council
  - Chairman: Łukasz Listwoń

Area
  - Total: 3.91 km^{2} (1.51 sq mi)

Population (2018)
  - Total: 22,655
  - Density: 5,790/km^{2} (15,000/sq mi)
- Time zone: UTC+1 (CET)
  - Summer (DST): UTC+2 (CEST)
- Area code: +48 91
- Car plates: ZS
- Climate: Cfb
- Website: drzetowo-grabowo.osiedla.szczecin.pl

Drzetowo-Grabowo is a municipal neighborhood of Szczecin, West Pomeranian Voivodeship, Poland, part of the Śródmieście district and borders on the north on Północ district. It was formed on the basis of two, historical neighborhoods - Drzetowo and Grabowo. On 2018, the estimated population of Drzetowo-Grabowo was 22,655 residents.

== See also ==
- Szczecin-Drzetowo
- Szczecin-Grabowo
