= 1 Maja Avenue, Łódź =

Street in Łódź, Poland

1 Maja Avenue
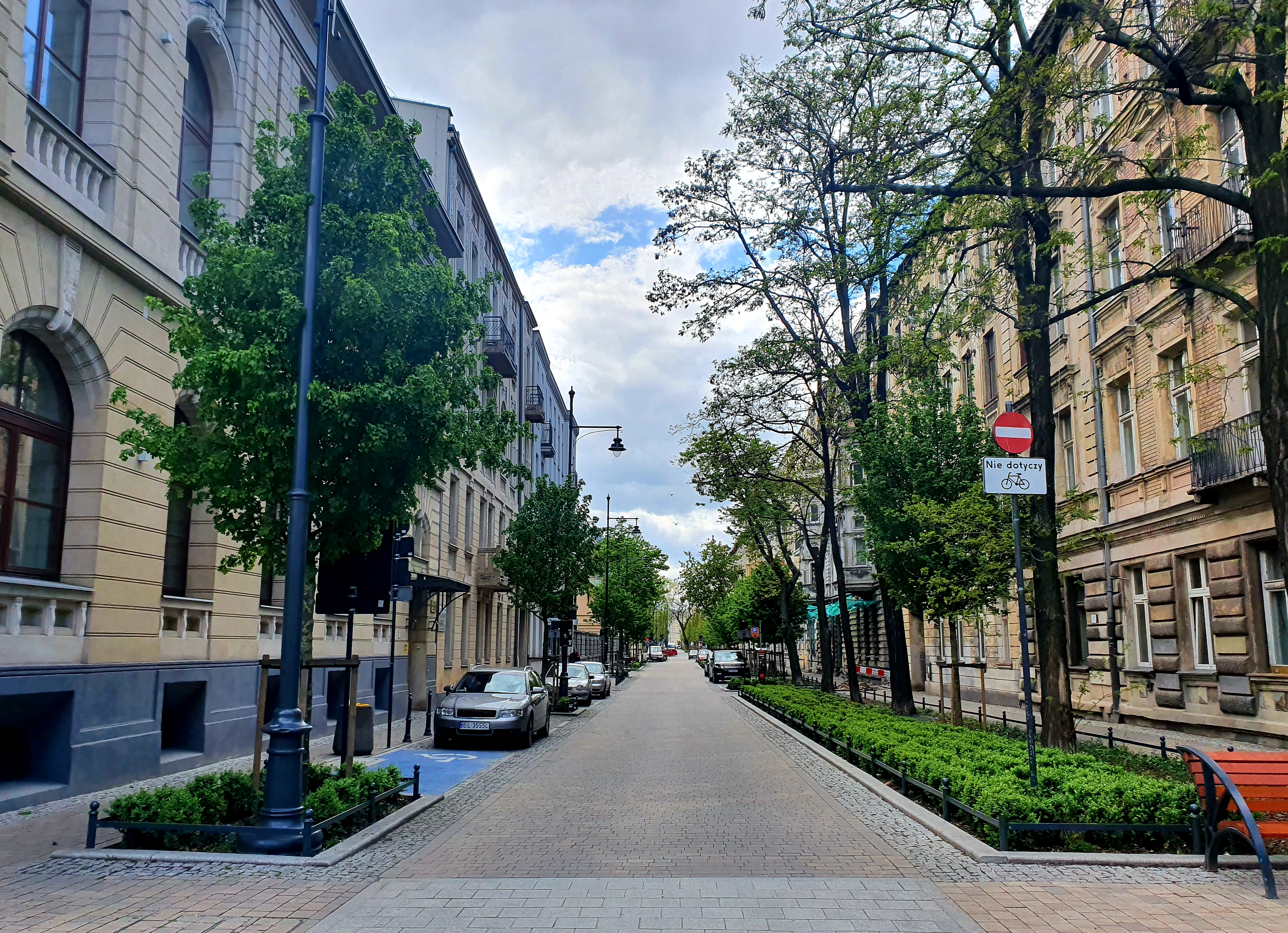
- 1 Maja Avenue viewed from Wólczańska Street (2020)
- Interactive map of 1 Maja Avenue
- Former name: Szulc Passage
- Part of: Stare Polesie
- Length: 1.8 km (1.1 mi)
- Location: Łódź
- Coordinates: 51°46′24.1″N 19°27′03.2″E

1 Maja Avenue (formerly Szulc Passage) is a street in the Polesie district of Łódź, within the Stare Polesie Urban Information System area, approximately 1.8 km long, connecting Wólczańska Street with Włókniarzy Avenue. The initial section of the avenue – between Wólczańska and Gdańska streets – is part of the city's tourist-historical zone.

For most of its length (from Wólczańska Street to Zielona Street), the avenue has been one-way since 30 July 1974, with traffic moving west to east, towards the city center. The section from Zielona Street to Włókniarzy Avenue is two-way. The avenue has the status of a district road (No. 1182E) of class D.

The initial part of the avenue (odd numbers 1–39 and even numbers 2–36) belongs to the Roman Catholic Parish of Saint Joseph the Betrothed of the Blessed Virgin Mary, while the remainder (since 1 October 1989) belongs to the Roman Catholic Parish of Saint Matthew the Evangelist.

== History ==
Initially, the street was a dirt road between municipal arable lands. Its course was mostly set in the 1860s and 1870s, during the establishment of a new part of the city – the so-called Wiązowa district. It began at what was then Długa Street (now Gdańska Street) and led in a direction roughly southwest toward the city limits near what is now Włókniarzy Avenue. In June 1891, it was extended to the section of Wólczańska Street, laid out the year before, and since then, it has started there, measuring about 1.8 km in length. Around 1893, it was likely named Szulc Passage (or Avenue), after the names of landowners Paweł and Otto Schulz (Szulc). On the map drawn by Władysław Starzyński between 1894 and 1896, it already appeared as Szulc Passage (Пассажъ Шульца).

The garden of Otto Julius Schulz's heirs, originally covering the area of today's properties at numbers 2–6, was transferred in July 1891 to the brothers Herman and Ryszard Gehlig, owners of the steam brewery "Bracia Gehlig" at 7/13 Ogrodowa Street.

In September 1895, electric street lighting was installed on the passage. At the same time, the sale of vacant plots along the passage for factory and tenement construction began.

The avenue was paved around 1905, when the city authorities allocated 14,000 rubles for the task. In a small 1909 monograph-guide to Łódź, the passage was already listed among the principal streets, although the author mistakenly claimed it was served by a tram line.

During the German occupation of the city from 1915 to 1918, it was called Schulz Zeile. In 1919, the name was changed to 1 Maja Avenue. In the interwar period, a Jewish orphanage was located in the building at number 20, most likely managed by Chaim Rumkowski. Several schools also had their headquarters on the avenue: at number 11, the private coeducational kindergarten of Ida Janowska; at number 12, Nusen Sendowski's cheder; at number 20, the private Jewish school "Orchot-No-am II"; at number 25, the Polish girls' Primary School No. 23, directed by Maria Kędzierska; at number 37, the private Jewish school "Jesodej Hatora" No. 4; at number 50, the Polish coeducational Primary School No. 2, directed by Ludwik Gidyński; at number 52, the male elementary school "Szkoła Polska No. 6" for children celebrating the Shabbat, directed by Szymza Sznapper; at number 87, Public Primary Schools No. 11 and No. 15. A health center of the "Kropla Mleka" society, established in 1904 as the first section of the Warsaw Hygiene Society, operated at number 22.

Danuta Mniewska-Dejmek, who as a child (from 1927 to 1939) lived with her parents and sister at 71 1 Maja Avenue, in a tenement house near the barracks of the 28th Kaniowski Rifle Regiment (owned by a Jewish landlord, Moszek Zdanowski), described the avenue in a March and April 2006 interview as "a very beautiful street with rows of magnificent chestnut trees". She also recalled that "many officers lived nearby. And many Germans". By 1937, the avenue was fully sewered. During World War II, the occupiers renamed it Scharnhorststraße in 1940, in honor of the Prussian General Gerhard von Scharnhorst.

After the war, the pre-war name was restored, which was convenient for the communist authorities, though it was originally introduced by the city's pre-war authorities linked to the Polish Socialist Party, commemorating the International Workers' Day celebrated on May 1.

On 17 December 1967, the first buses of the newly launched 74 city bus line passed through 1 Maja Avenue, connecting Norbert Barlicki Square with Teofilów.

Between 2011 and 2013, the avenue ranked 86th among the 362 Łódź streets with the highest number of traffic accidents. In this period, 14 accidents occurred, injuring 18 people, including 6 seriously.

In the 2015 Łódź participatory budgeting, a project called "Restore the Glory of Szulc Passage – Reconstruction of 1 Maja Avenue between Wólczańska and Gdańska Streets" was submitted. The project's proposals sparked extreme emotions among residents, ranging from admiration to firm opposition. The project received 2,138 votes, which was not enough for it to be qualified for implementation. In 2016, as part of the "Green Polesie" program, the city planned to transform part of the avenue (the section between Wólczańska and Stefan Żeromski streets) into a garden street. Work on the reconstruction of the initial section of the avenue (between Wólczańska and Gdańska streets) began on 10 August 2017 and was completed in late May 2018. By the end of April 2020, the reconstruction of the section between Gdańska and Stefan Żeromski streets was finished.

=== Famous residents ===
- Julian Tuwim – 5 Szulc Passage, flat 13, 1896–1902 or 1903
- Irena Tuwim – 5 Szulc Passage, flat 13, from 22 August 1898 or 1899 to 1902 or 1903
- Danuta Mniewska-Dejmek (née Gusta Mniewska) – 71 1 Maja Avenue, flat 71, 1927–1939
- Franciszek Szwankowski – 87 1 Maja Avenue, from the 1920s (construction of the building) until his death on 23 February 1936.

=== Chronology of street name changes ===
Period	Street name
Around 1893–1915	Szulc Passage (vel Avenue) / Пассажъ Шульца
1915–1918	Schulz Zeile
1918–1919	Szulc Passage
1919–1940	1 Maja Avenue
1940–1945	Scharnhorststraße
Since 1945	1 Maja Avenue

== 1 Maja Avenue in film ==
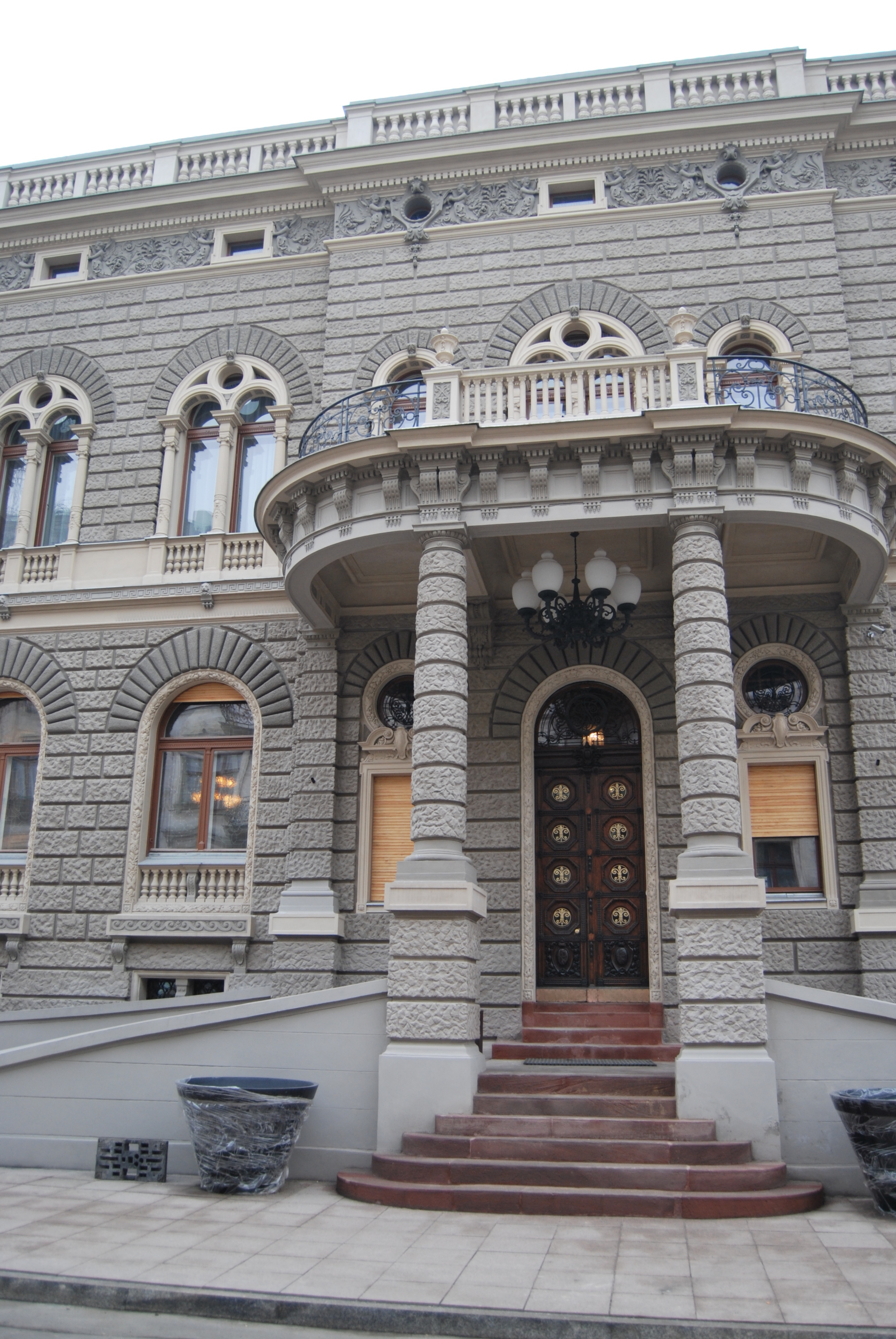
Entrance to the Karol Poznański Palace (32 Gdańska Street) from the side of 1 Maja Avenue (February 2015)

1 Maja Avenue has served as a film location multiple times. The following scenes were filmed here:

- Some street scenes from the movie Argument About Basia directed by Maria Kaniewska (1959), in front of the driveway to the former Karol Poznański Palace – in the film, it housed a café that Stanisław Olszowski often visited.
- Final scenes from episode 3 of the TV series Niewiarygodne przygody Marka Piegusa (1967), directed by Mieczysław Waśkowski, titled "The Third Adventure, or the Incredible Pile-Up of Accidents", around the "Flaszka" operation, which involved a first encounter with a thief – located near the intersection of 1 Maja Avenue and Lipowa Street, where one of Albert Flasz's gang hideouts and a Ballroom Dancing School were situated.
- A scene at the driveway to Herman Buchholz's palace (actually the former Karol Poznański Palace, now the seat of the Music Academy) in the film and TV series The Promised Land directed by Andrzej Wajda (1974, 1975) – where Karol Borowiecki (Daniel Olbrychski) brings the drunken Moryc Welt (Wojciech Pszoniak) back to consciousness and delivers a message about a planned increase in cotton tariffs.
- Scenes in front of the Europa Hotel (actually in front of the main entrance to the former Karol Poznański Palace, now the seat of the Music Academy) in the TV series Kariera Nikodema Dyzmy directed by Jan Rybkowski and Marek Nowicki (1980).
- Scenes in front of the hospital where Dr. Andrzej Hoffman works (actually in front of the former Karol Poznański Palace) in the film Tam i z powrotem directed by Wojciech Wójcik (2001).
- Scenes in front of the Music Academy in episodes 4 and 8 of the TV series Komisarz Alex directed by Robert Wichrowski (2012).
- A scene in which a police commissioner (Jan Frycz) is pushed into a concrete truck during a chase in the crime-comedy Weekend (2010) – the directorial debut of Cezary Pazura – filmed in June 2010 at the intersection of 1 Maja Avenue and Wólczańska Street.
- Some street scenes from the film Music, War & Love directed by Martha Coolidge (2017), filmed in October 2015 between Wólczańska and Gdańska streets and at the intersection with Gdańska Street.

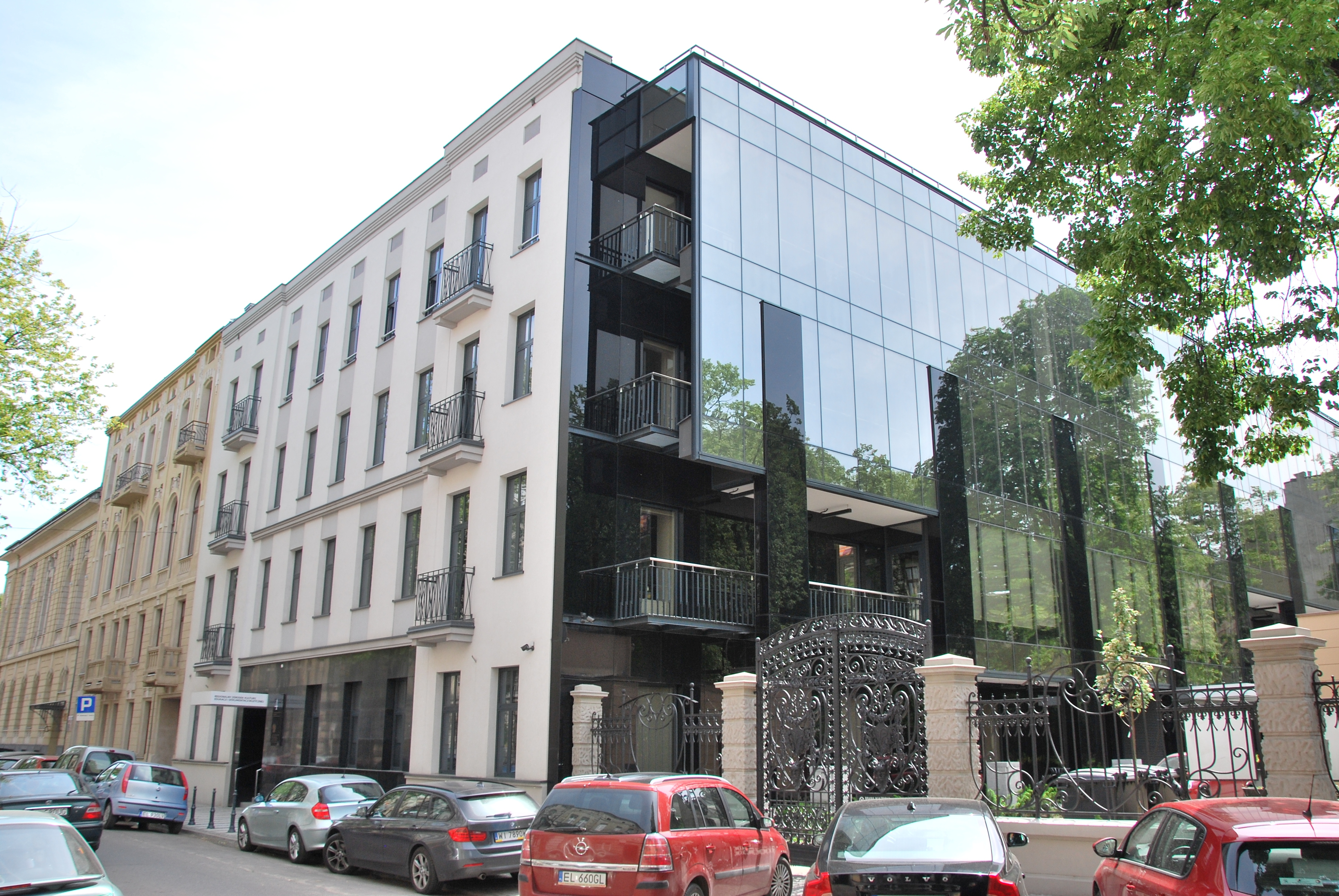
Building of the Regional Center for Culture, Education, and Music Documentation of the Academy of Music (May 2015)

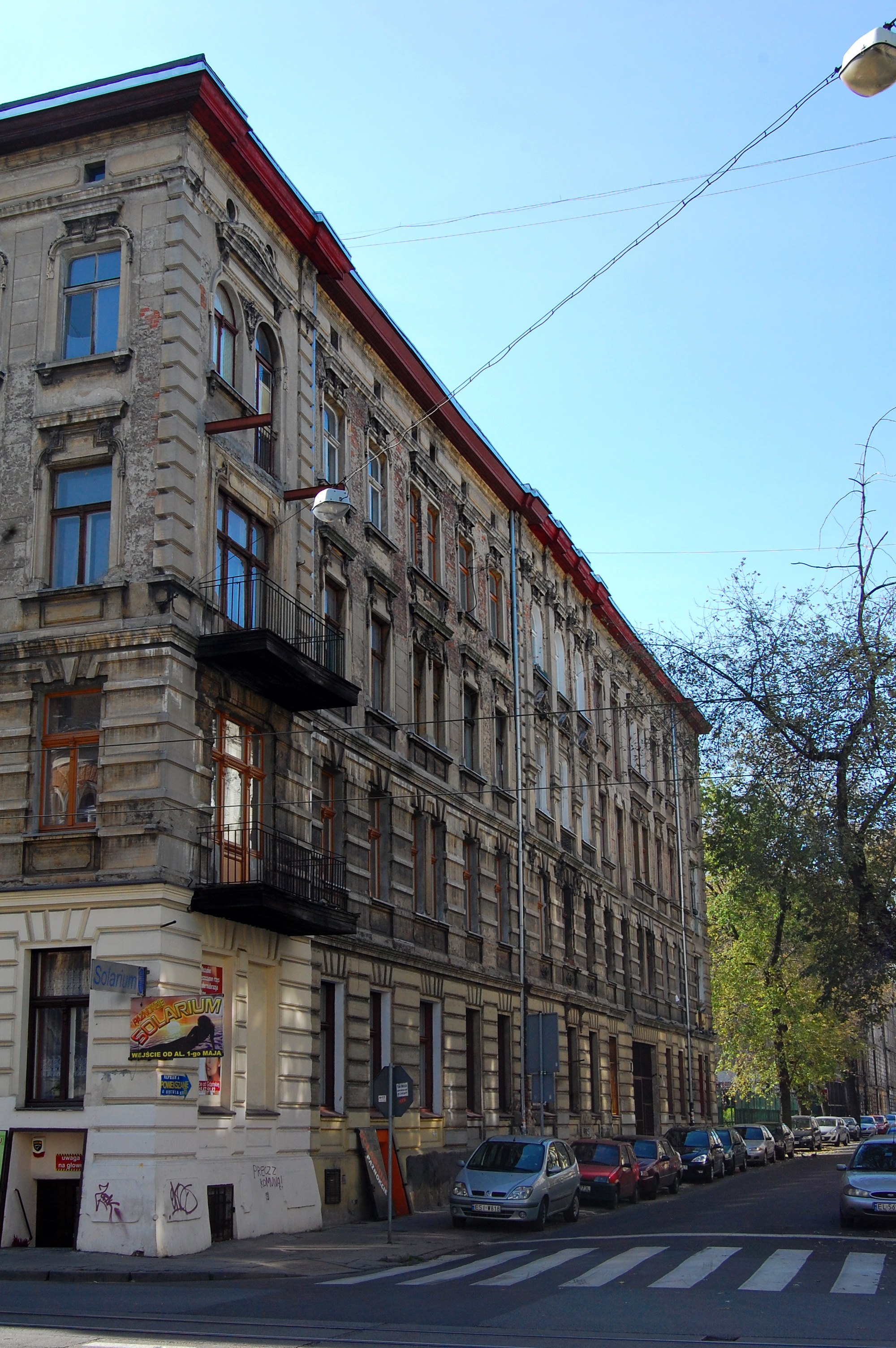
Avenue with a view of the tenement house of Anton and Ewa Rybak (September 2011)

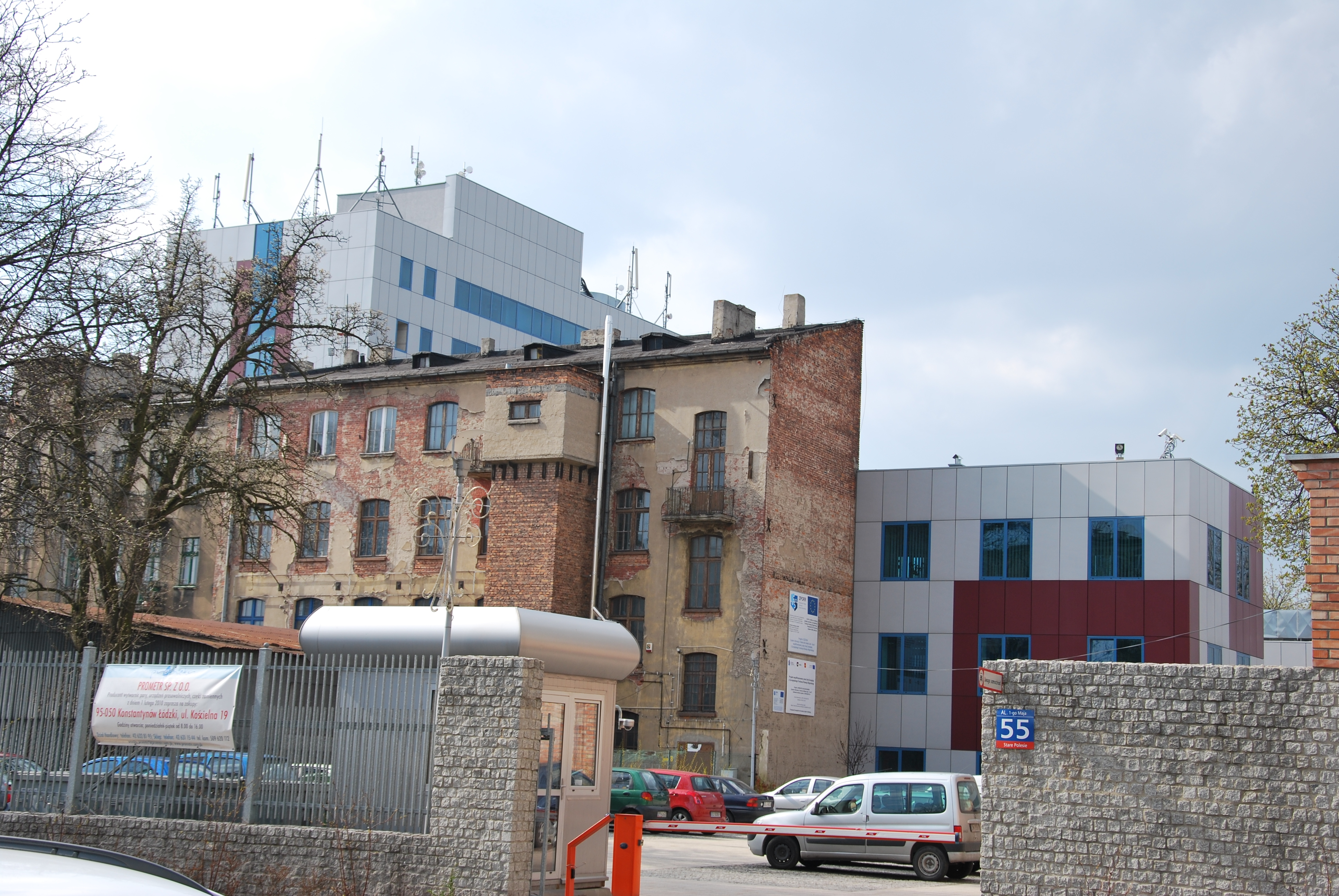
Business House office center before expansion from the side of 1 Maja Avenue (April 2011)

== Buildings ==
- No. 2 (and 5 Wólczańska Street): Former ballroom and wedding venue, headquarters of the Jewish People's House "Bet-Am" from March 1915 until World War II, and home to the Arlekin Puppet Theatre since 1955.
- No. 4: Regional Center for Culture, Education, and Music Documentation of the Academy of Music, located in a building reconstructed and expanded between 2013 and 2014, officially opened on 25 September 2014.
- No. 5: Tenement of Samuel Filon Cohn, second home of Julian Tuwim from 1896 to 1902/1903, and birthplace of his sister Irena on 22 August 1898/1899. The Tuwim family occupied a three-room apartment (no. 13) on the third floor of the right wing. Tuwim mentioned Szulc Passage in 1934 in the weekly Wiadomości Literackie.
- No. 6: Part of the former residence of Karol Poznański.
- Corner with Gdańska Street: Main entrance to the Renaissance Revival Karol Poznański Palace (1904–1908), now housing the Academy of Music.
- No. 8 (and 33 Gdańska Street): Eclectic tenement of Anton and Ewa Rybak (1894–1902), designed by Piotr Brukalski, listed as a heritage site.
- No. 24/26: Daycare center of the Municipal Social Welfare Center.
- No. 31/33 (and 2 Lipowa Street): Former woolen goods factory of Majer Max Schröter (1930).
- No. 55–59: Business House office center.
- Corner with Gen. Lucjan Żeligowski Street: Former J. Piłsudski Barracks of the 28th Kaniowski Rifle Regiment, now housing the Medical University Museum and Department of History of Military Science and Medicine.
- No. 87: Business Center 1 Maja 87, previously the Mechanical Furniture Factory of F.J. Szwankowski.
- No. 89: Building of the Economic-Tourism-Hospitality School Complex named after Władysław Grabski (since 1 September 2019), previously Public Gymnasium No. 26 (1999–2019) and Primary School No. 159 (prior to 1 September 1999).
- No. 119/121: Former industrial facilities of the Wiosna Ludów Wool Industry Plant, featuring remnants of Łódź's longest mural (over 270 meters) visible from Zielona Street, created by Zbigniew Łopata.

As of August 2016, 21 tenement houses on 1 Maja Avenue (with the numbers: 1–11, 8, 15, 16–22, 19–25, 35–39, 43, and 77) were listed in the municipal register of monuments in the city of Łódź, including:

- The tenement house of Chaja Kępińska at number 1 (two front buildings),
- The tenement house of Samuel Filon Cohn at number 5 (front building with side wings),
- The tenement house of the Laufer family at number 7 (front building with side wings),
- The tenement house of Anton and Ewa Rybak at number 8 (and 33 Gdańska Street) – registered as a monument (no. A/29),
- The tenement house of Józefa Piotrkowska at number 9 (front building with side wings).

Additionally, the register includes a residential building at number 28 and the former woolen goods factory of Majer Max Schröter at numbers 31/33 (and 2 Lipowa Street).

== Numbering and postal codes ==
- Even numbers: 2–114; in the German source from the period of World War II, as Scharnhorststraße: 2–124
- Odd numbers: 1–123; in the German source from the period of World War II, as Scharnhorststraße: 1–127
- Postal codes: 90-717 (1–17 odd); 90-718 (2–28 even); 90-739 (19–39 odd); 90-740 (41–63 odd); 90-741 (30–44 even); 90-755 (65–95 odd); 90-756 (46–88 even); 90-766 (90–end even, 97–end odd)
