= Arlekin Puppet Theatre =

Puppet theatre in Łódź, Poland

- Teatr Lalek "Arlekin" im. Henryka Ryla (Polish)
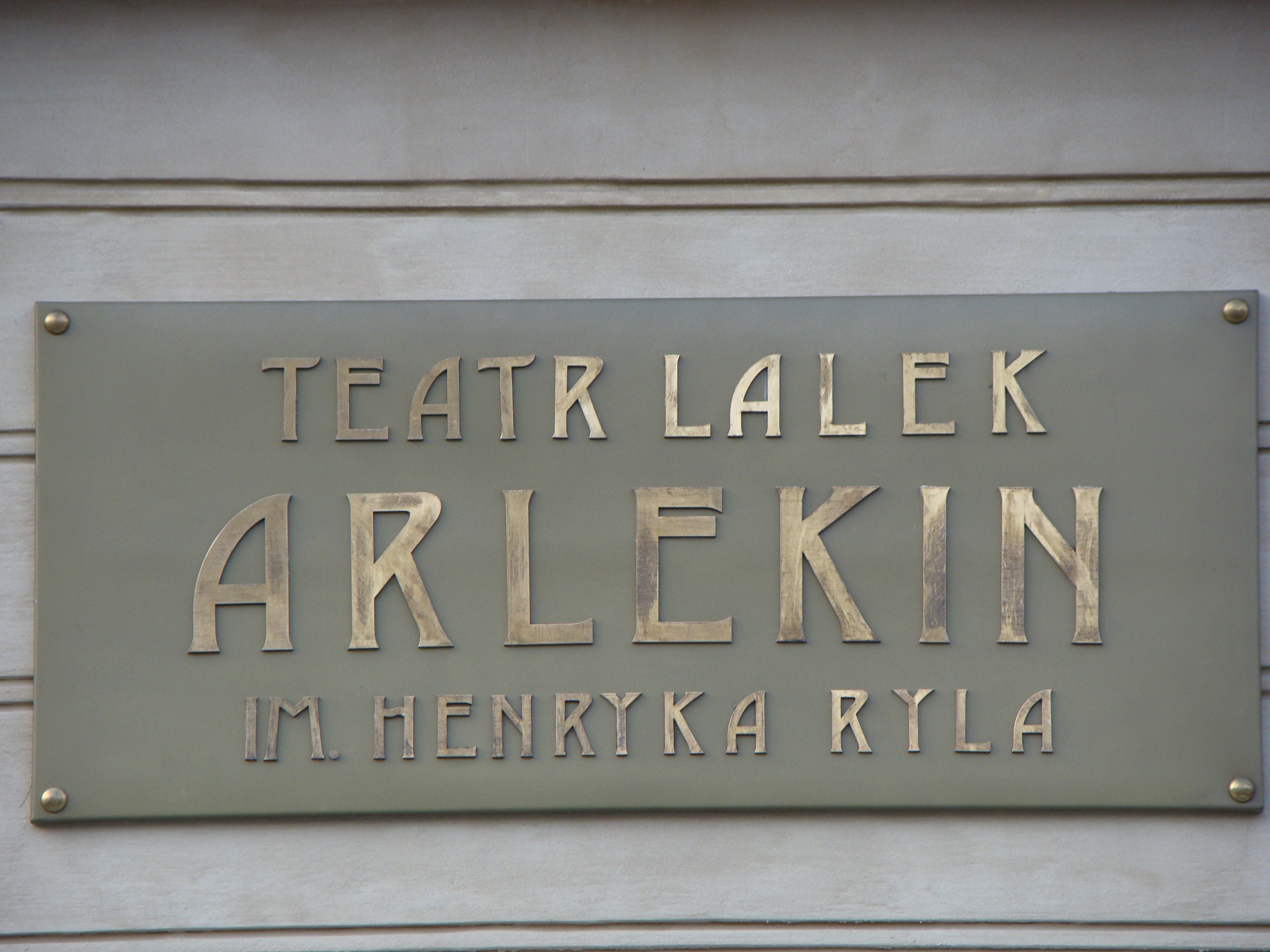
- Interactive map of Arlekin Puppet Theatre
- Address: 2 1 Maja Avenue; 5 Wólczańska Street; Łódź; Poland
- Operator: Wojciech Brawer
- Type: Puppet theatre

Construction
- Opened: 1948

Website
- www.teatrarlekin.pl

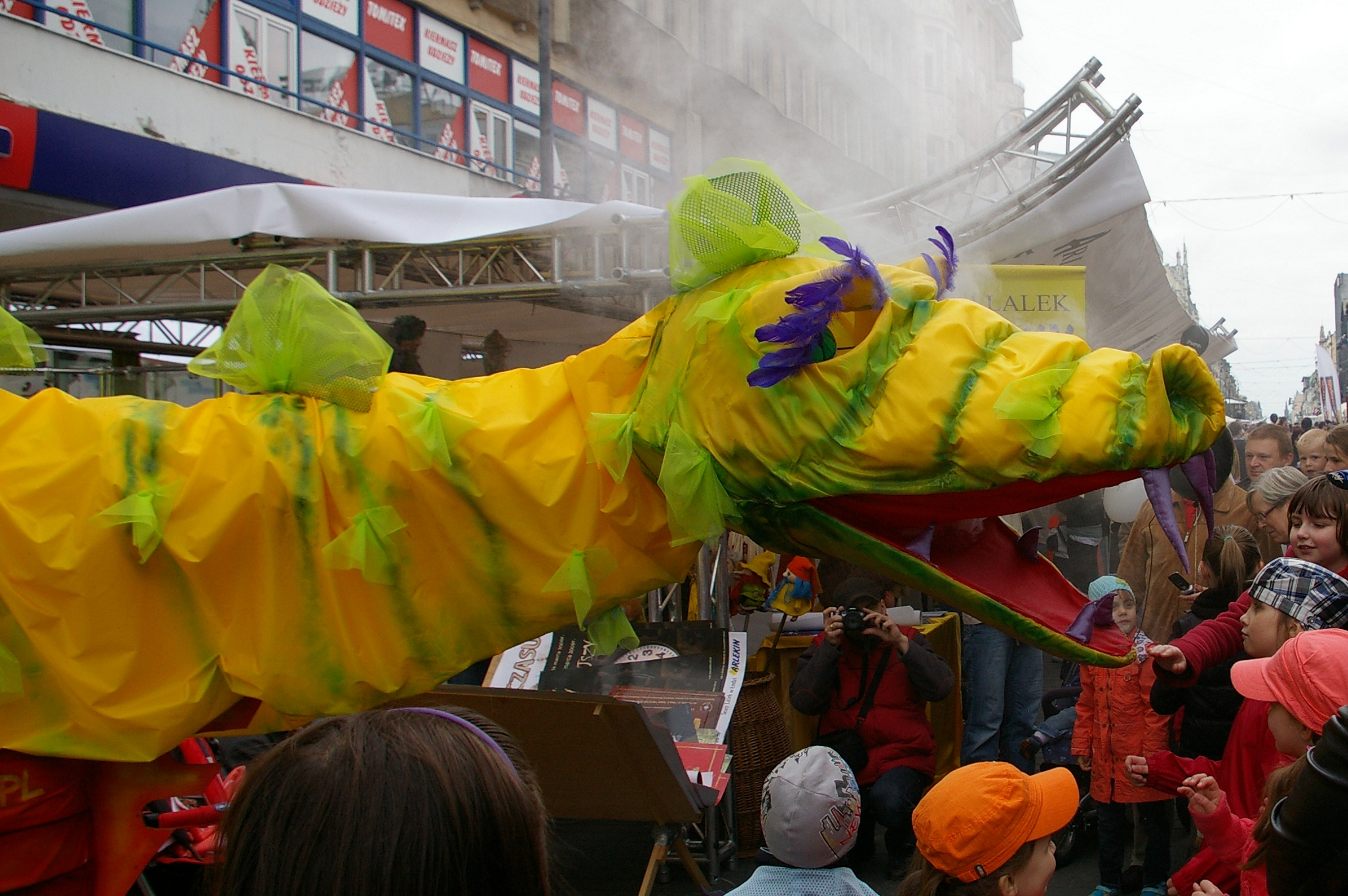
Arlekin Theatre's dragon during Łódź City Day on Piotrkowska Street

Arlekin Puppet Theatre, officially named Henryk Ryl Arlekin Puppet Theatre in Łódź, is a puppet theatre in Łódź, Poland.

== History ==
The theatre was founded by Henryk Ryl, who also served as its first director. On 13 July 1948, the Ministry of Culture and Arts granted Ryl permission to establish a puppet theatre in Łódź. The theatre's first venue was at 150 Piotrkowska Street. Its debut performance, Dwa Michały i świat cały (Two Michaels and the Whole World), written by Henryk Ryl, premiered on 28 December 1948. The second production, Kolorowe piosenki (Colourful Songs), was long considered a "model performance for the youngest audience". On 23 October 1949, the play Wesoła maskarada (Merry Masquerade) introduced an actor in a mask on stage for the first time. The theatre also began offering performances for adults, such as Tamara Gabbe's Dzielny gród (Brave City) and Molière's Lekarz mimo woli (The Doctor in Spite of Himself).

On 1 January 1950, the theatre was nationalized. In 1955, the Piotrkowska Street venue was closed for failing to meet safety standards, and performances moved to a building at 5 Wólczańska Street. Since 1962, the theatre has been the sole occupant of this building. On 24 July 1961, the theatre hosted the first meeting of the Polish Puppetry Centre of the International Puppetry Union (POLUNIMA), with Jan Sztaudynger elected as chairman. Since its establishment in 1961, POLUNIMA has been based at 2 1 Maja Avenue.

In 1959, the theatre premiered Konstanty Ildefons Gałczyński's Młynek do kawy (The Coffee Grinder), with set design by Stanisław Fijałkowski, featuring inanimate objects as protagonists.

Henryk Ryl served as director and artistic director until 1964, then as artistic director until 1974, and later as a director and programme consultant until 1978. His final directed production was Marcinek zuch (Brave Marcinek) in 1982. In 1964, Regina Elkan became director, during which time the theatre gained ownership of the Wólczańska Street building. In 1974, Ryl's student Stanisław Ochmański, who debuted at Arlekin in 1951 and previously led the Hans Christian Andersen Puppet and Actor Theatre in Lublin, became director. Ochmański focused on intimate productions, avoiding Ryl's grand stagings and experimental approaches, prioritizing "well-written plays for puppet theatre". In the late 1970s, a "preschool stage" was introduced, offering small-scale performances in kindergartens. In 1978, for the theatre's 30th anniversary, a major renovation was completed, and in 1989, Arlekin received the "Heart for a Child" medal.

In 1992, Waldemar Wolański, a graduate of the Puppetry Faculty of the Aleksander Zelwerowicz National Academy of Dramatic Art and an actor at Arlekin since 1981, became director. From 1999, the theatre organized the biennial International Festival of Puppetry Soloists, and from 2006, the TrotuArt International Street Art Festival. In 2015, these festivals were replaced by AnimArt, with its first edition held from 19 to 24 September.

A comprehensive renovation of the theatre's buildings was completed in 2014. On 27 December 2014, the theatre was officially named after Henryk Ryl.

In June 2018, Waldemar Wolański was dismissed as director and replaced by Wojciech Brawer.

Since 1981, the theatre has operated a Documentation Workshop collecting materials on Polish puppetry. Puppets designed for Arlekin productions are displayed in the Puppetry Department of the Archaeological and Ethnographic Museum in Łódź.

The theatre collaborates with the Museum of Cinematography in Łódź on a programme combining theatre visits with museum tours. The Harnam Folk Dance Ensemble operates within the theatre's structure.

== Henryk Award ==
In 2009, the Puppet Theatre Section of the Union of Polish Stage Artists established the Henryk Award for creative achievements in puppet theatre, named after Arlekin's founder, Henryk Ryl. Laureates receive "Henryk" statuettes.

== Theatre building ==
Arlekin Puppet Theatre building
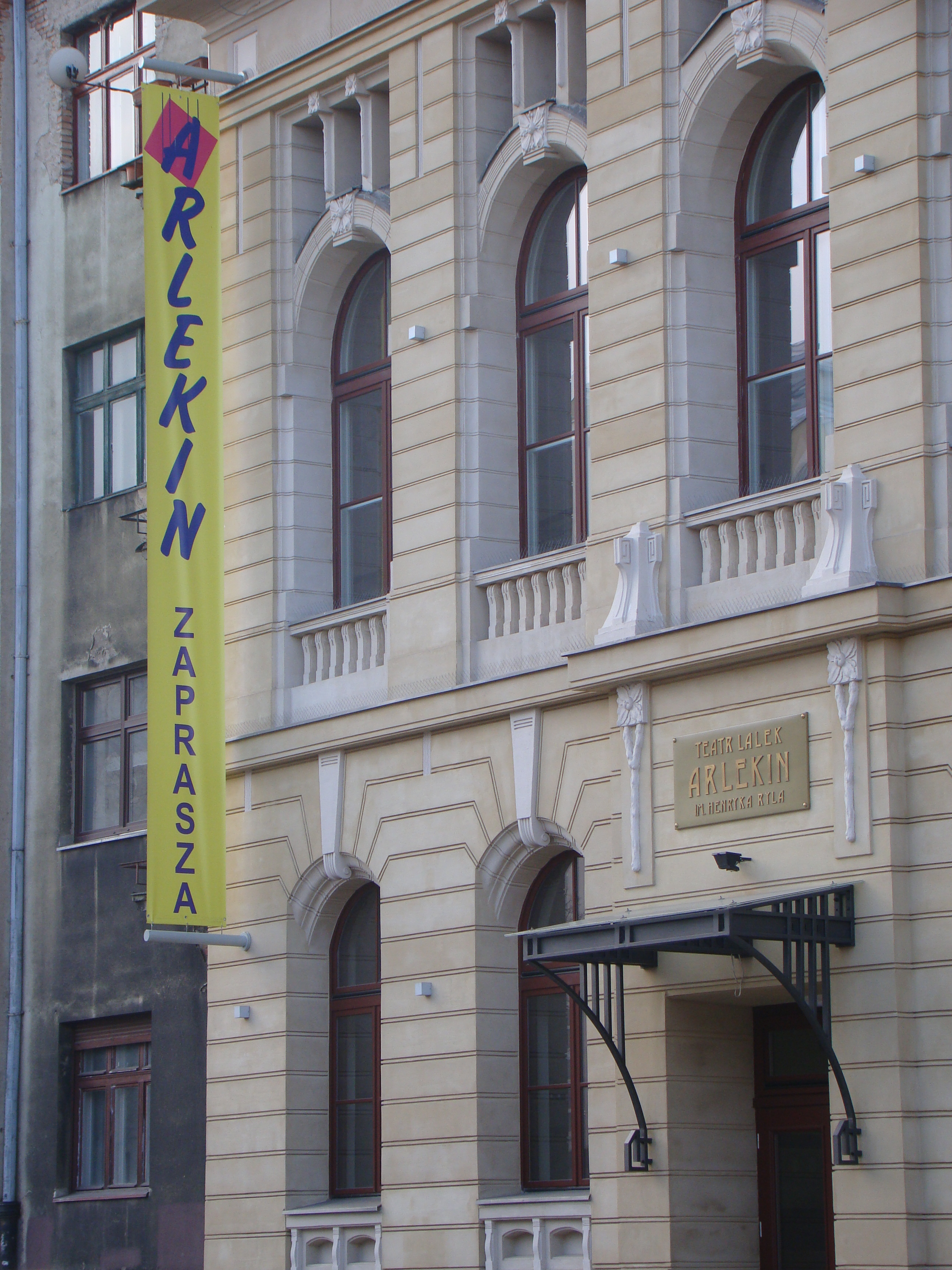
- Interactive map of the Arlekin Puppet Theatre building area

General information
- Architectural style: Art Nouveau
- Location: Łódź, 5 Wólczańska Street, Poland
- Coordinates: 51.773200°N 19.450800°E
- Completed: 1902

Technical details
- Floor count: 2

Design and construction
- Architect: Gustaw Landau-Gutenteger

The theatre's building at 5 Wólczańska Street was constructed in 1902 as the Offenbach Dance House, hosting concerts and social events. During the interwar period, it served as a Jewish People's House. Arlekin has occupied the building since 1955.

In 1978, the building was renovated, with interiors designed by Stanisław Cuchra-Cukrowski and Wiesław Błażewski. On 8 December 1994, it was listed in the register of monuments under number A-356.

Between 2012 and 2014, the theatre underwent another major renovation. During construction, from February 2013, performances were held at the White Factory complex at 282a Piotrkowska Street.

After the renovation, completed by late 2014, the former house at 5 Wólczańska Street houses administration, workshops, and a small stage, while the main stage and hotel facilities are located in the adjacent building at 2 1 Maja Avenue.
