= Stanisław Juchnowicz =

Polish architect (1923–2020)

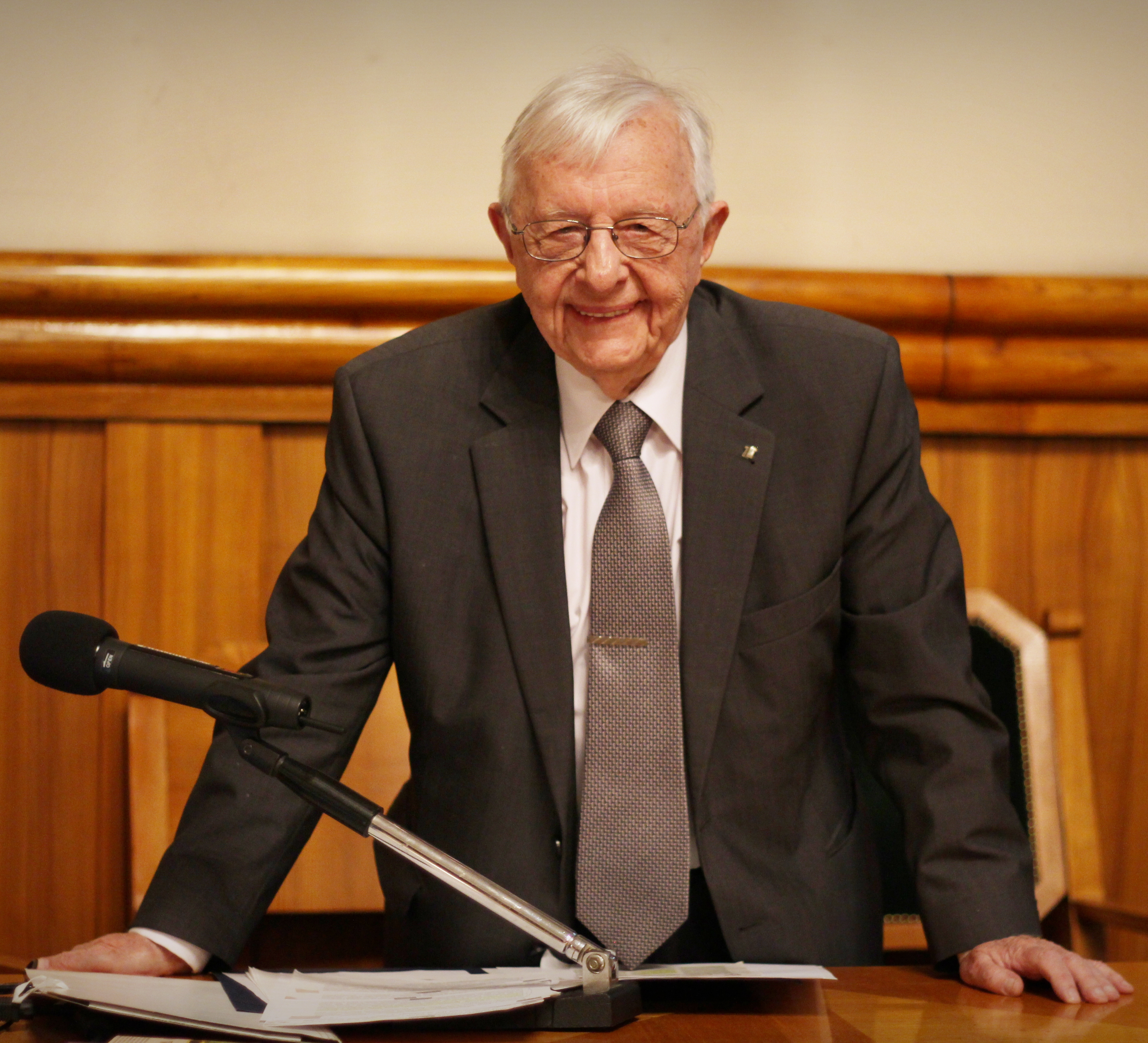
- Stanisław Juchnowicz, 2015
- Born: 10 June 1923; Lida
- Died: 31 January 2020 (aged 96); Kraków
- Citizenship: Polish
- Occupations: Architect, urban planner

Stanisław Juchnowicz (10 June 1923 – 31 January 2020) was a Polish architect, urban planner, professor of technical sciences, soldier of the Home Army, lecturer at the Kraków University of Technology and dean of the Faculty of Architecture of the Kraków University of Technology (1984), co-author of the urban plan of Nowa Huta.

He was a member of Association of Polish Architects, Polski Klub Ekologiczny and an honorary member of the Towarzystwo Urbanistów Polskich. He was buried at the Salwator Cemetery.

== Awards ==
- Officer's Cross of the Order of Polonia Restituta (30 July 1999)
- Knight's Cross of the Order of Polonia Restituta
- Silver Cross of Merit (15 July 1955)
- Medal of the Commission of National Education (2012)
- "Honoris Gratia" Badge (2006)
- "Work Champion" Badge (1953)
- Gold Badge of SARP

== Bibliography ==
- "Sielskie anielskie czy trudne i żmudne". Profesor NIEzwyczajny: wspomnienia profesorów Politechniki Krakowskiej. Kraków: Wydawnictwo Politechniki Krakowskiej. 2011. ISBN 978-83-7242-593-5.
