= List of cemeteries in Poland =

The following is a list of selected cemeteries in Poland.

== Lesser Poland Voivodeship ==
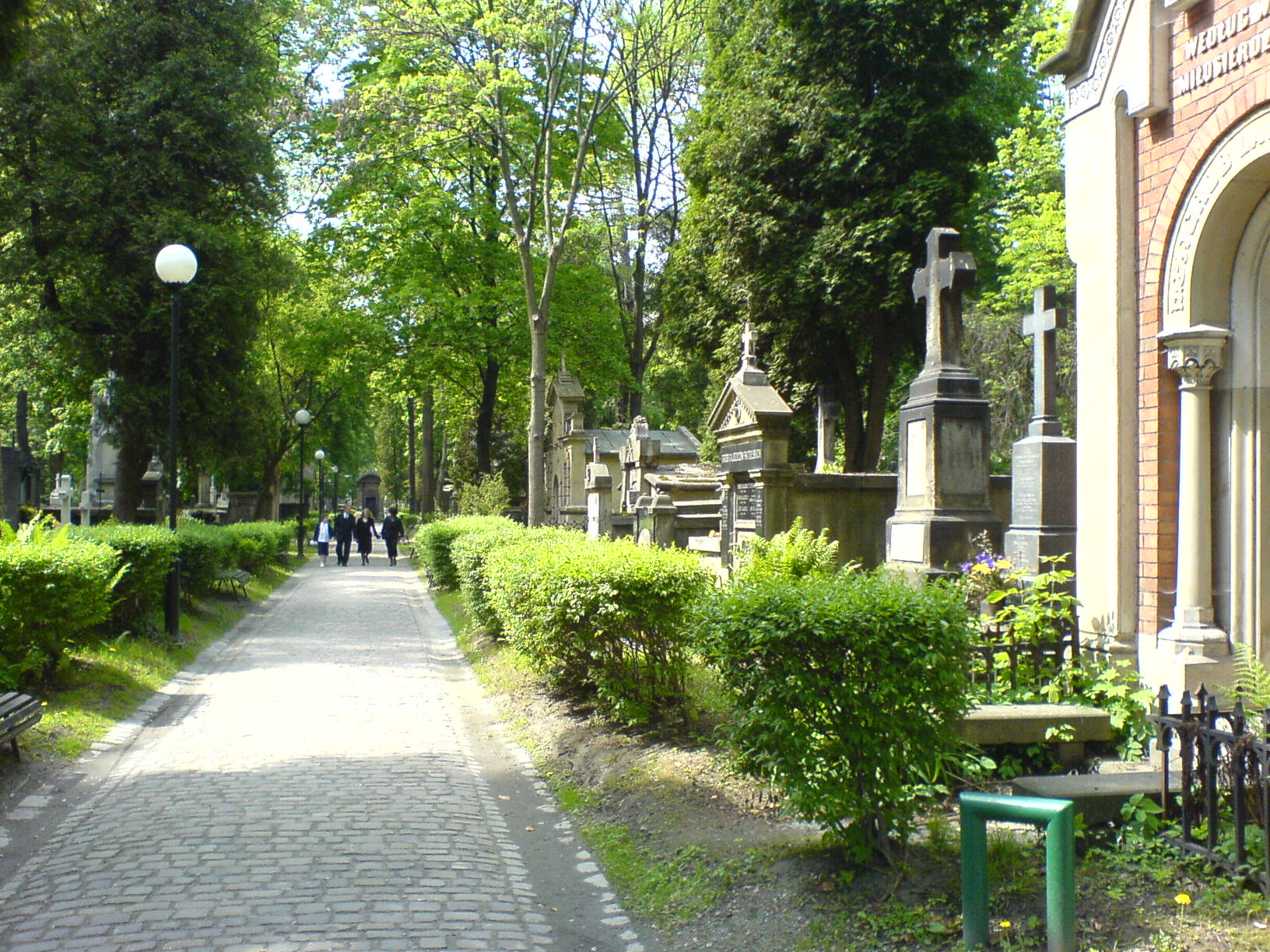
Rakowicki Cemetery in Kraków with a two-hour walk. Parents of Pope John Paul II, are buried here.

- Rakowicki Cemetery, Kraków (Old Town). Buried, include pilots shot down over Poland with those originally buried in Warsaw, along with hundreds of Commonwealth of Nations casualties and prisoners of war who died during the German occupation.
- Wawel Cathedral with tombs of Polish kings, Kraków (St. Leonard's Crypt)
- Skałka national Panthéon of some of the most distinguished Poles, Kraków
- New Jewish Cemetery, Kraków (Kazimierz district)
- Remah Cemetery, Kraków (Kazimierz)
- Jewish Cemetery of Podgórze (pl), Kraków (Podgórze district)
- Mogilski cemetery (pl), Kraków (Nowa Huta district)
- Prokocim cemetery (pl), Kraków (Prokocim)
- Salwatorski cemetery (pl), Kraków (Zwierzyniec)
- Tyniecki cemetery (pl), Kraków (Dębniki)
- Jewish cemetery of Chrzanów
- Bieńczyce-Dłubnia Military Cemetery number 398. A single grave of an Austrian soldier which was named a 'cemetery' by the War Graves Branch K&K of the Austrian Military Commandant's Office of Kraków (German: Kriegsgräber-Abteilung K.u.K. Militär-Kommando Krakau) located in the Kraków Fortress of district XI (Twierdza Kraków) in southern Poland. For several decades, the grave was located near the contemporary Makuszyński street. It was removed in the mid 20th century during the construction of a major thoroughfare.

== Greater Poland Voivodeship ==
- Jewish cemeteries in Ostrów Wielkopolski
- Junikowo in Poznań
- Miłostowo in Poznań

== Lower Silesian Voivodeship ==
- Osobowice Cemetery in Wrocław
- Old Jewish Cemetery, Wrocław

== Łódź Voivodeship ==
- Jewish Cemetery, Łódź

== Lublin Voivodeship ==
- Old Jewish Cemetery, Lublin

== Lubusz Voivodeship ==
- Jewish cemetery in Skwierzyna

== Masovian Voivodeship ==
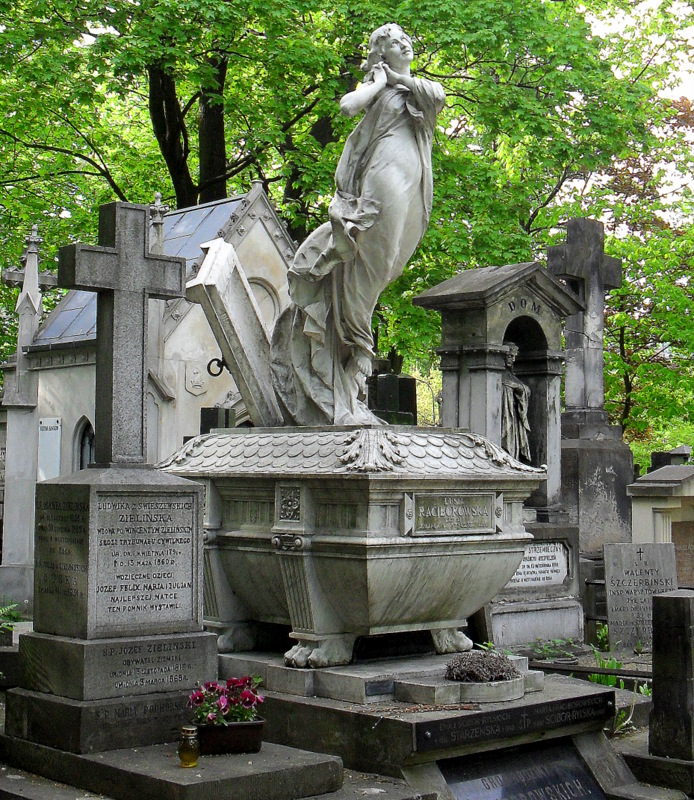
Powązki Cemetery in Warsaw is Poland's capital oldest and most famous cemetery

- Powązki Cemetery in Warsaw (Wola district)
- Bródno Jewish Cemetery, Warsaw (Targówek district)
- Warsaw Insurgents Cemetery (Wola)
- Soviet Military Cemetery, Warsaw
- Jewish Cemetery, Warsaw (one of the largest Jewish cemeteries in the world)
- Palmiry massacre Cemetery
- Evangelical-Augsburg Cemetery, Warsaw
- Protestant Reformed Cemetery, Warsaw
- Orthodox Cemetery, Warsaw

== Pomeranian Voivodeship ==
- Łostowicki Cemetery in Gdańsk
- Chełm-Gdańsk Cemetery

== Silesian Voivodeship ==
- Mater Dolorosa cemetery in Bytom
- Evangelical Lutheran cemetery, Cieszyn
- Old Jewish cemetery, Cieszyn
- War cemetery in Łazy

== Subcarpathian Voivodeship ==
- Tarnobrzeg Jewish Cemetery
- Nisko Jewish Cemetery
- Nisko Municipal Cemetery
- Rozwadów Parish Cemetery
- Rozwadów War Cemetery
- Stalowa Wola Municipal Cemetery
- Stany Parish Cemetery

== Świętokrzyskie Voivodeship ==
- Jewish Cemetery, Kielce
- Jewish cemetery in Wiślica

== West Pomeranian Voivodeship ==
- Central Cemetery in Szczecin
- Brodów Cemetery in Szczecin (closed)
- Grabowo Cemetery in Szczecin (closed)
- French Reformed Church Cemetery in Szczecin (closed)

== Notes ==
- Cmentarze24.pl: search engine of over 700 cemeteries in Poland.
