= Salwator Cemetery =

Historic cemetery in Kraków, Poland

Salwatorski Cemetery (Zwierzyniecki Cemetery)
- Cmentarz Salwatorski (Cmentarz Zwierzyniecki)
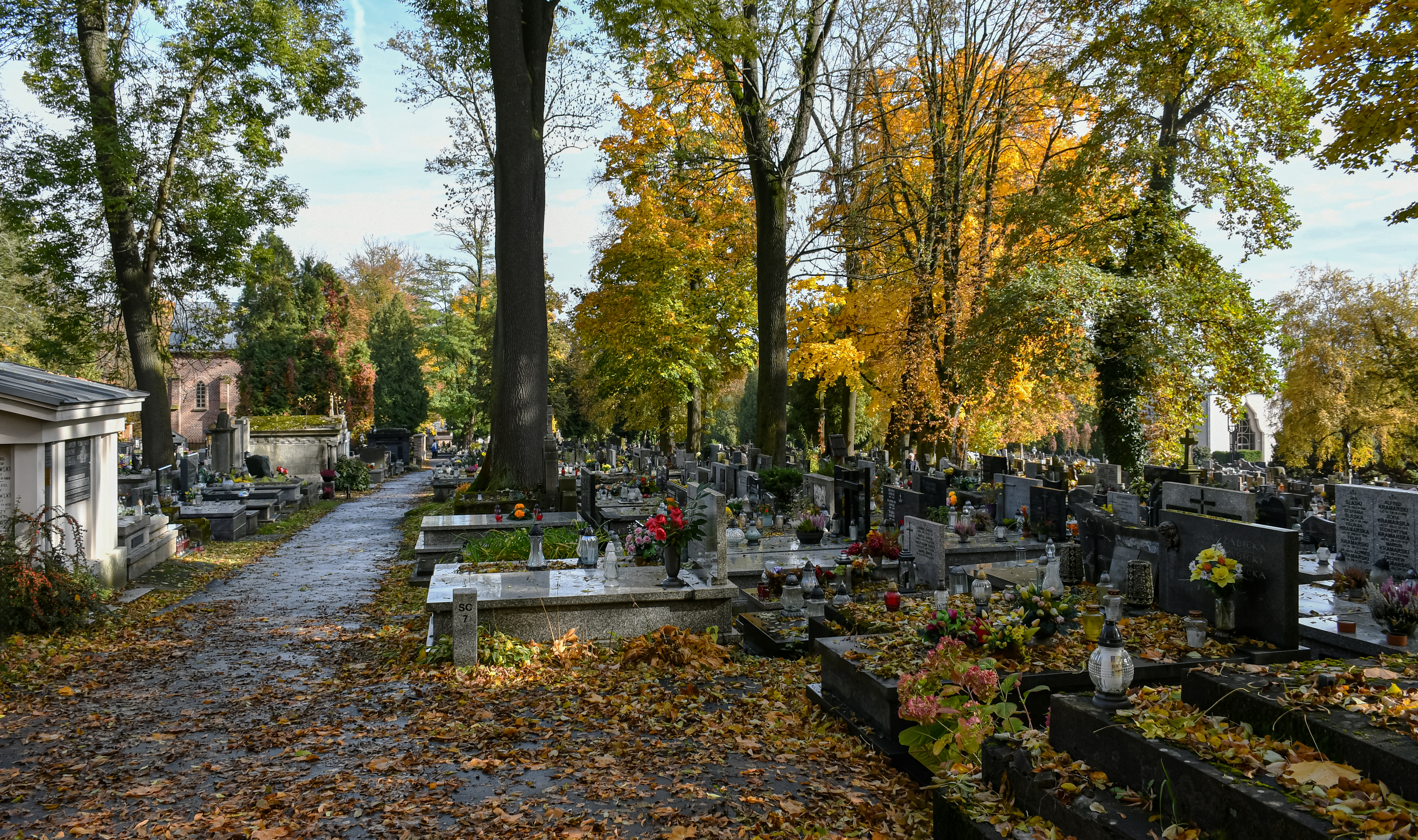

Details
- Established: 1865
- Location: G. Washington Avenue; Kraków
- Country: Poland
- Coordinates: 50°03′08.5″N 19°54′16″E
- Type: Parish
- Style: Architectural
- Owned by: Parafia Najświętszego Salwatora w Krakowie
- Size: ca. 5 ha
- Website: https://krakowsalwator.grobonet.com/grobonet/start.php

Salwator Cemetery (Polish: Cmentarz Salwatorski), is a historic parish cemetery located at George Washington Avenue in Zwierzyniec, the former district of Kraków, Poland.

== History ==
Consecrated in 1865, it was the parish cemetery of the former village of Zwierzyniec. The name Salwatorski comes from the nearby church of the Holy Saviour and the name of the parish.

The Salwator Cemetery is also known as the Zwierzyniecki Cemetery for its location in the Zwierzyniec District of Kraków, next to widely popular Kościuszko Mound. It is perceived by the locals as the nicest cemetery in the city. In 2002, a brand new chapel was erected there, based on design by Witold Cęckiewicz.

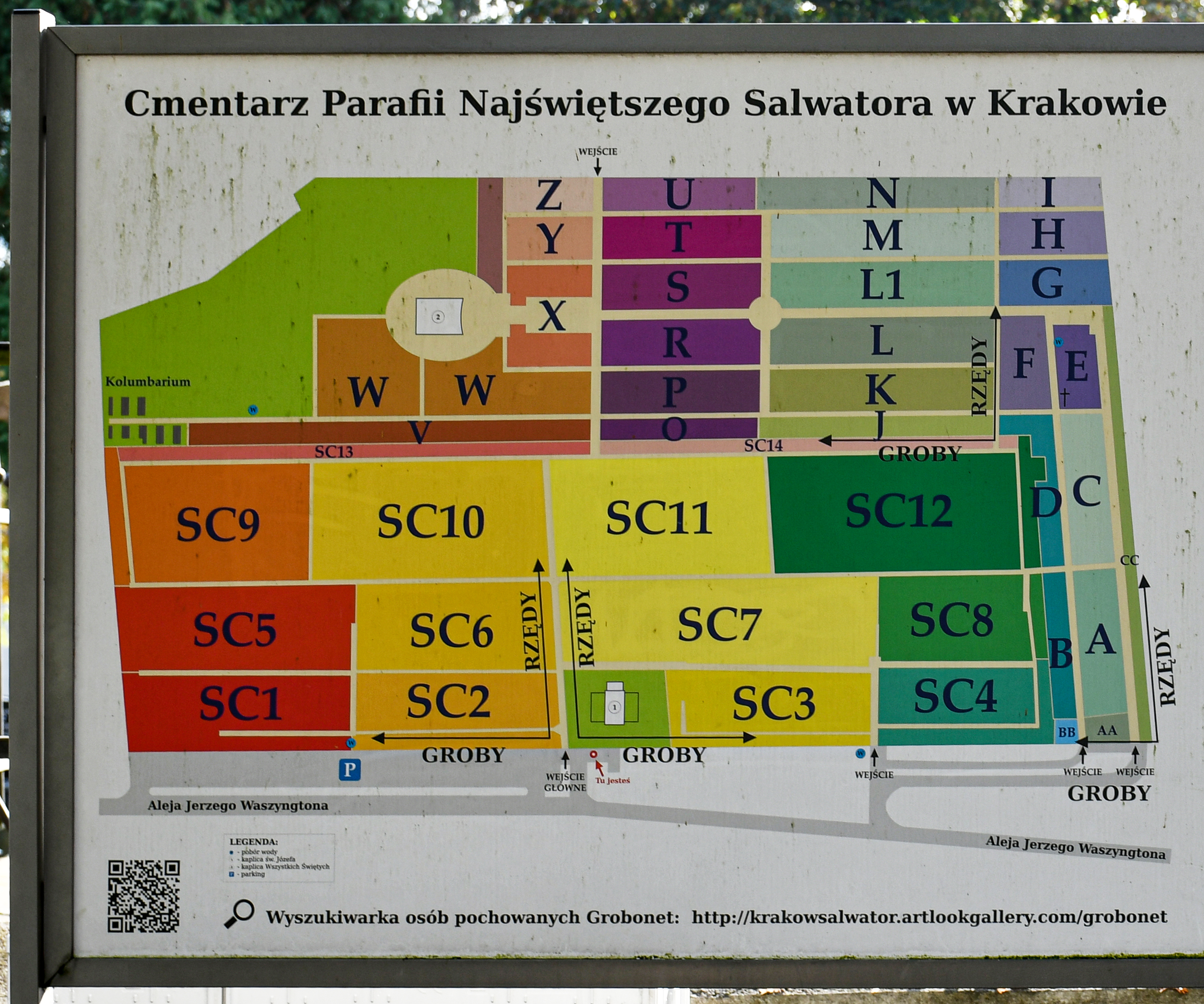
Plan

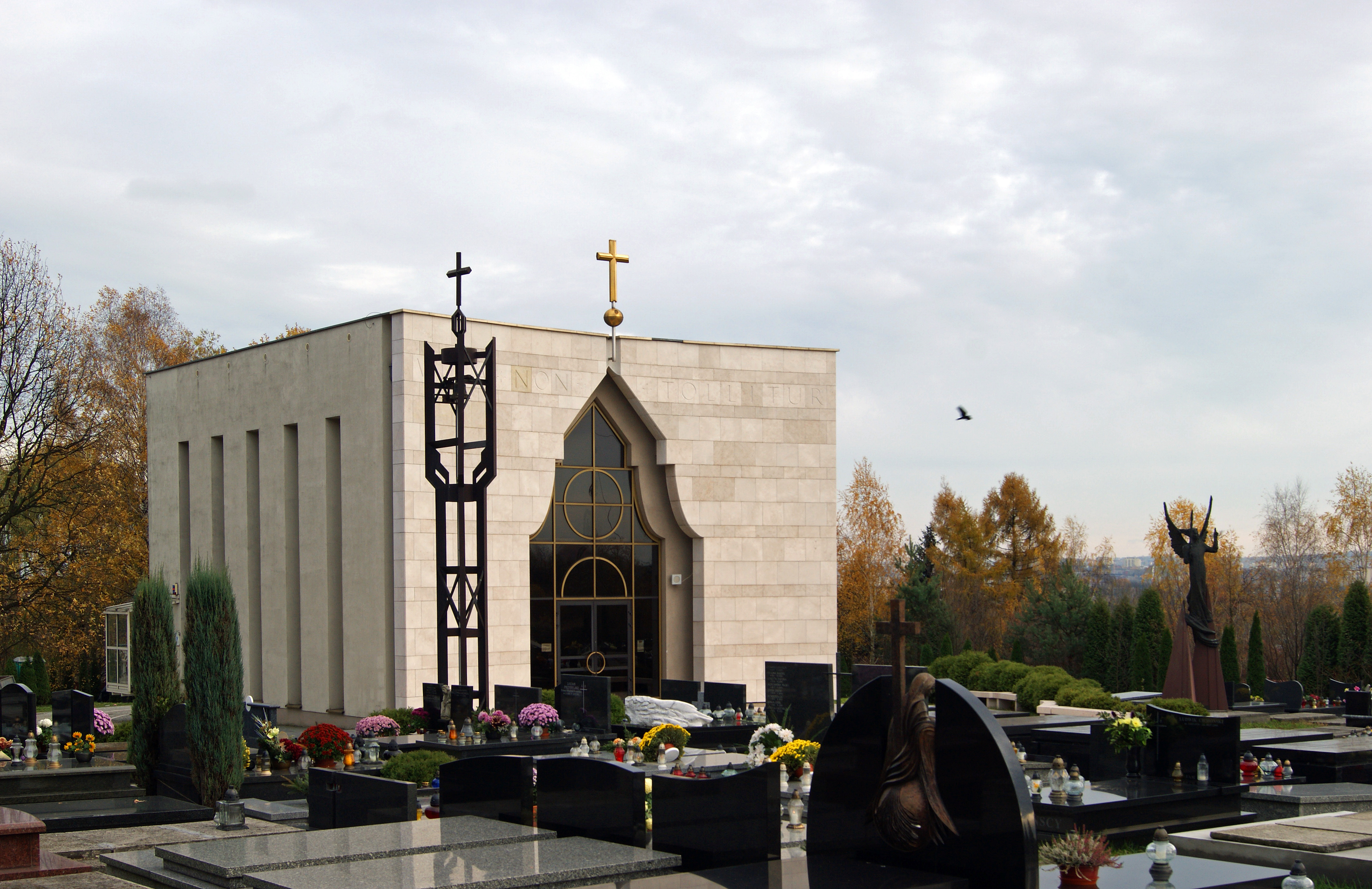
Chapel of All Saints

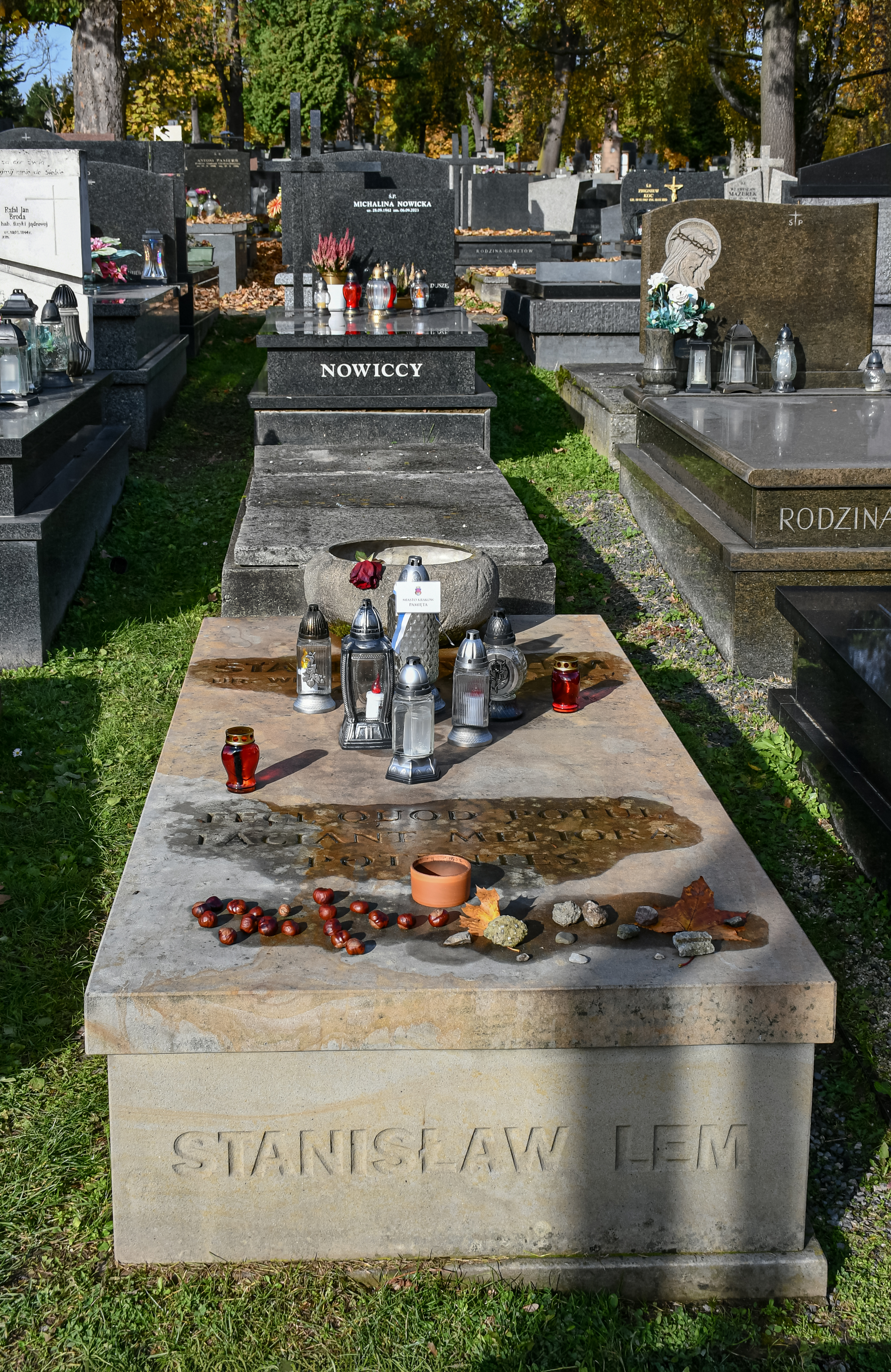
Stanisław Lem tomb

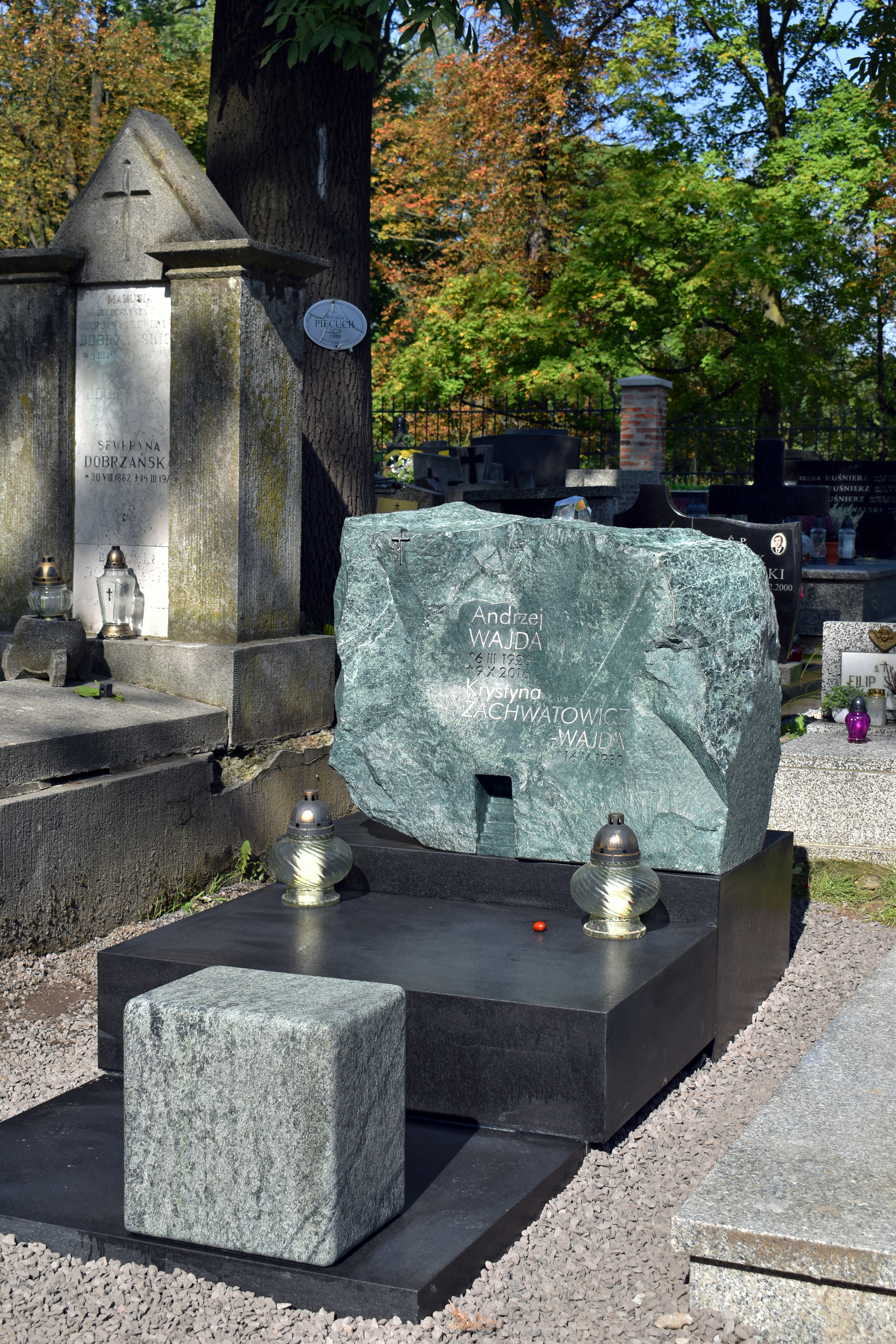
Andrzej Wajda tomb

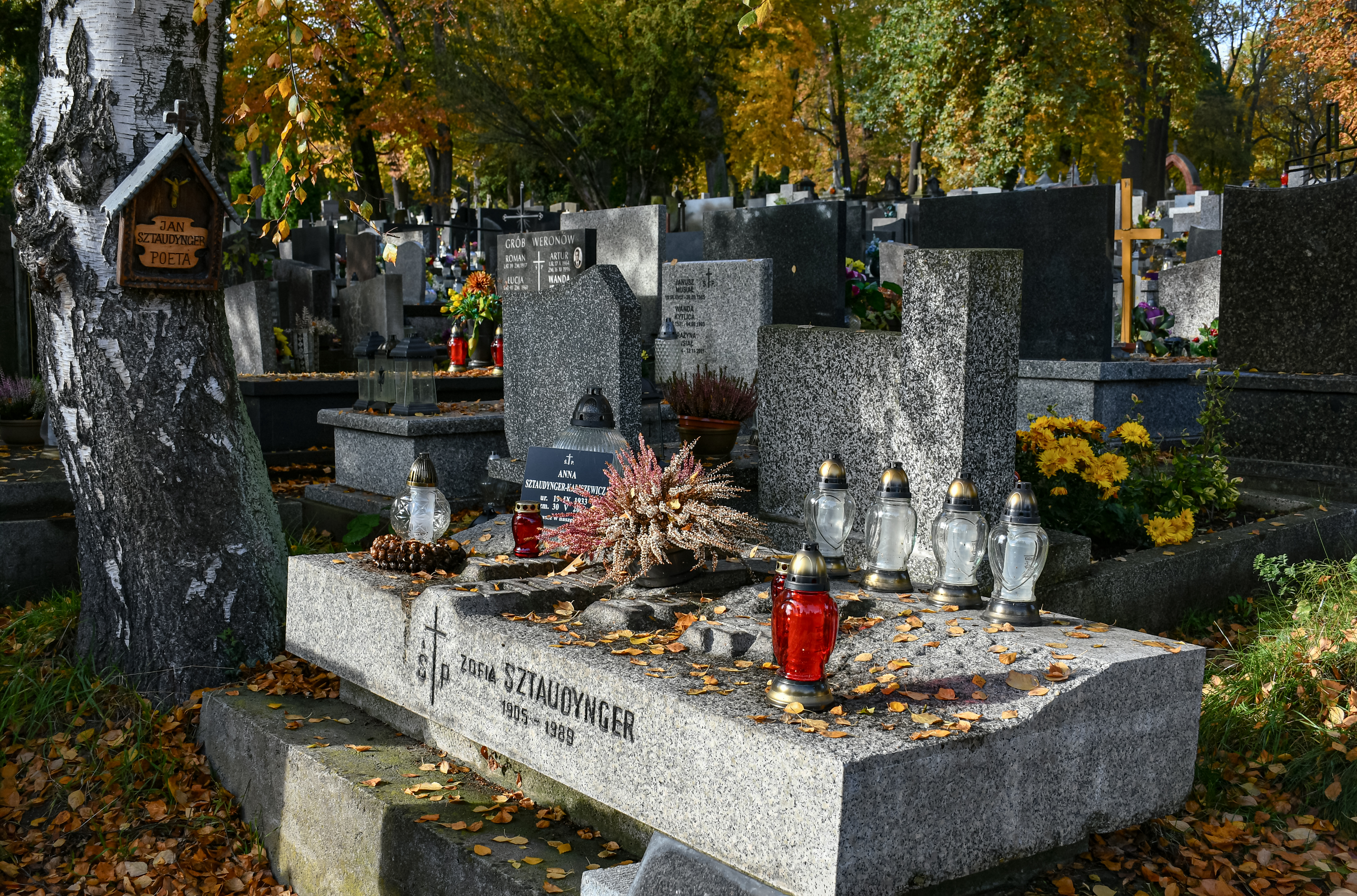
Jan Sztaudynger tomb

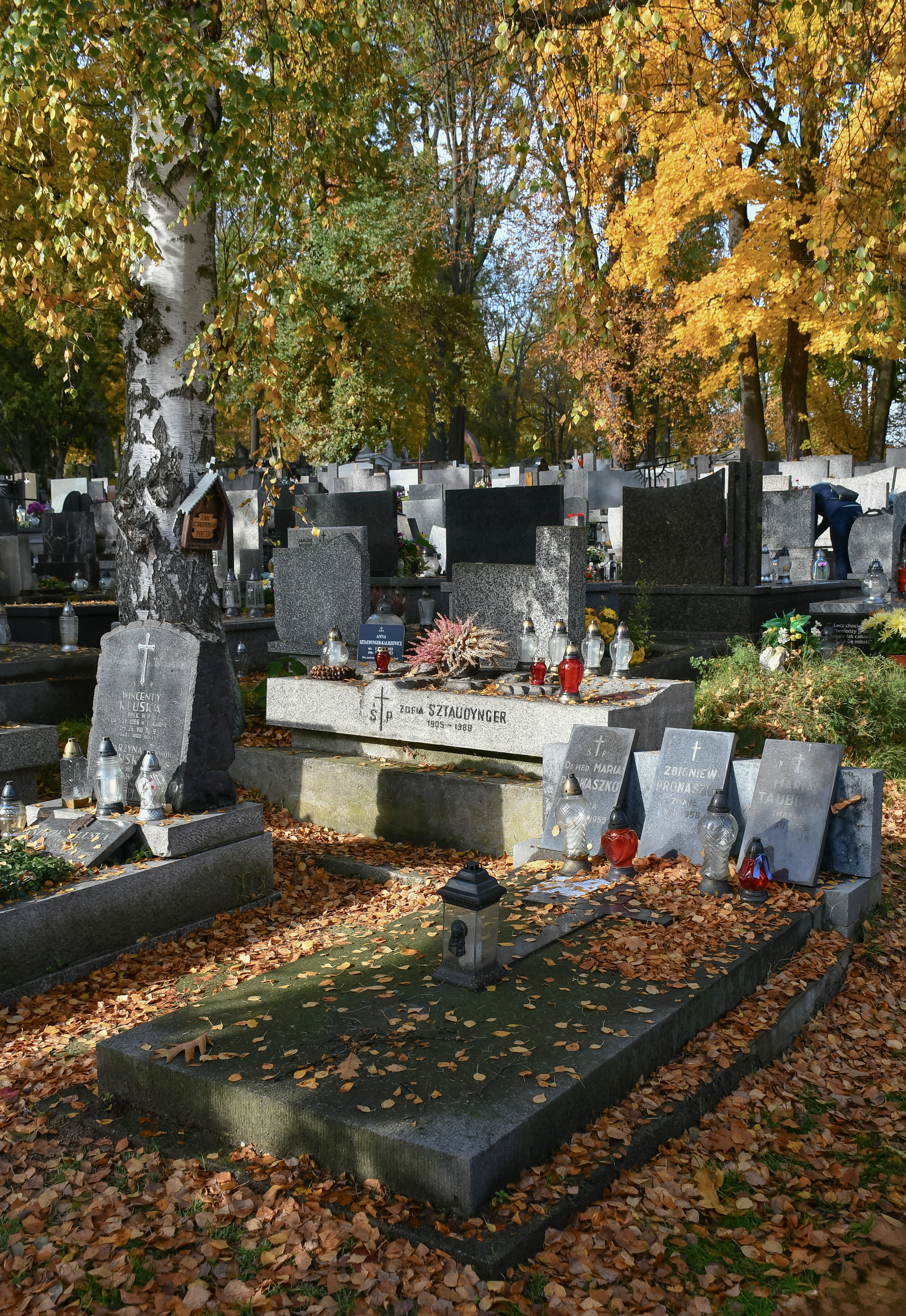
Zbigniew Pronaszko (painter and sculptor) tomb

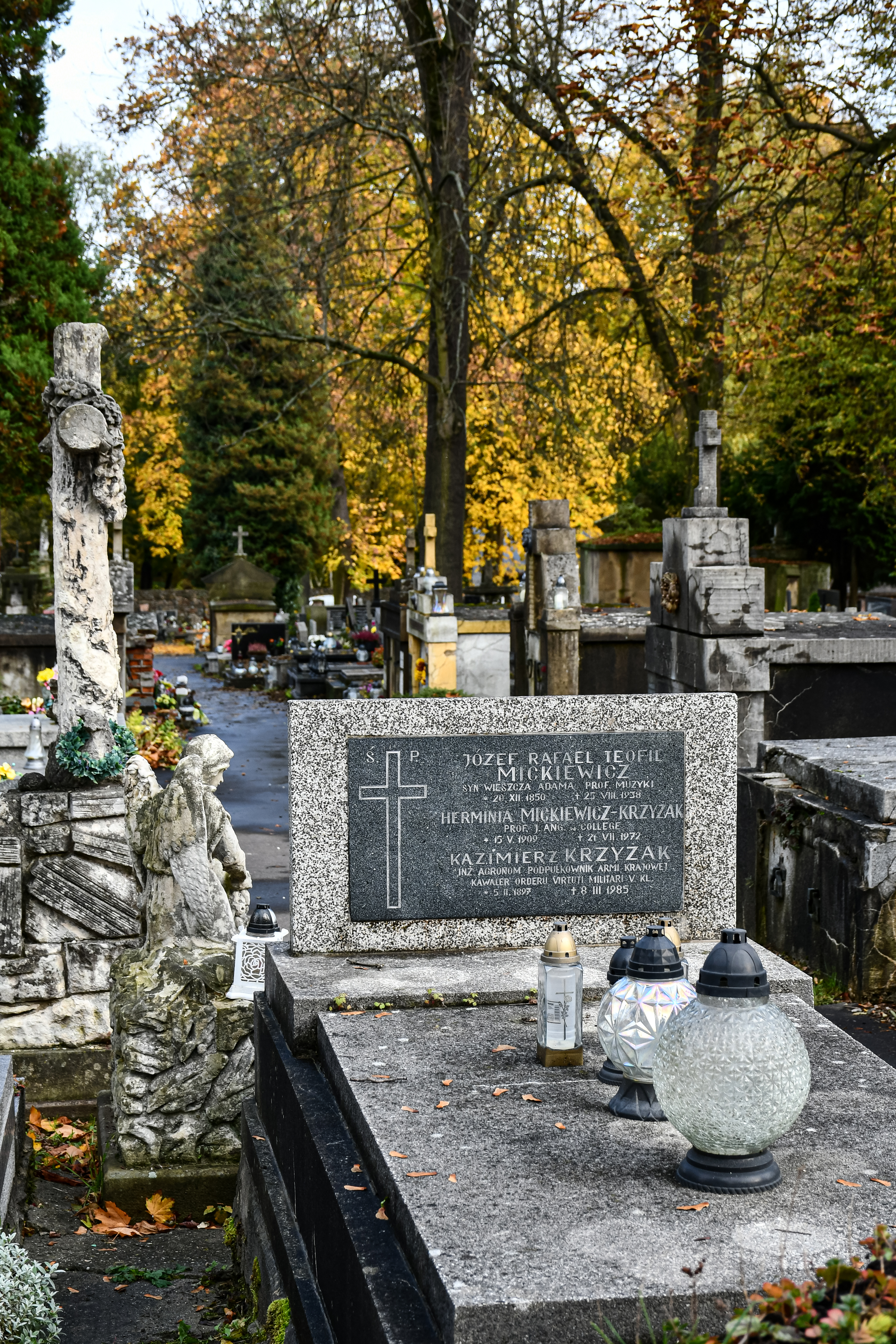
Józef Mickiewicz (son of Adam Mickiewicz) tomb

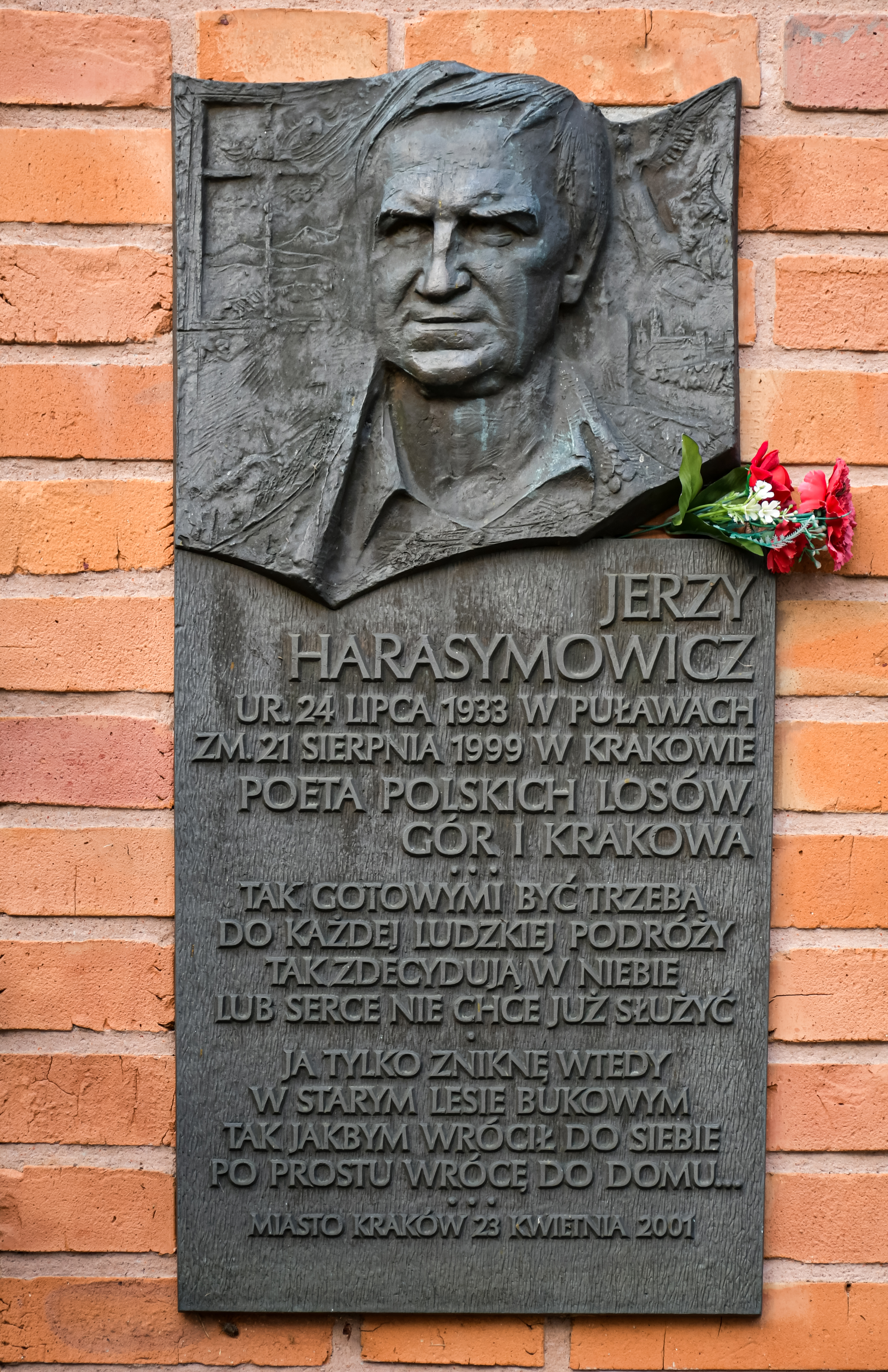
Jerzy Harasymowicz commemorative plaque

== See also ==
- Category:Burials at Salwator Cemetery
- List of cemeteries in Poland
