= Academy of Music, Łódź =

Music school in Łódź, Poland

Coordinates: 51°46′22.20″N 19°26′55.39″E

University of Music in Łódź
- Akademia Muzyczna w Łodzi
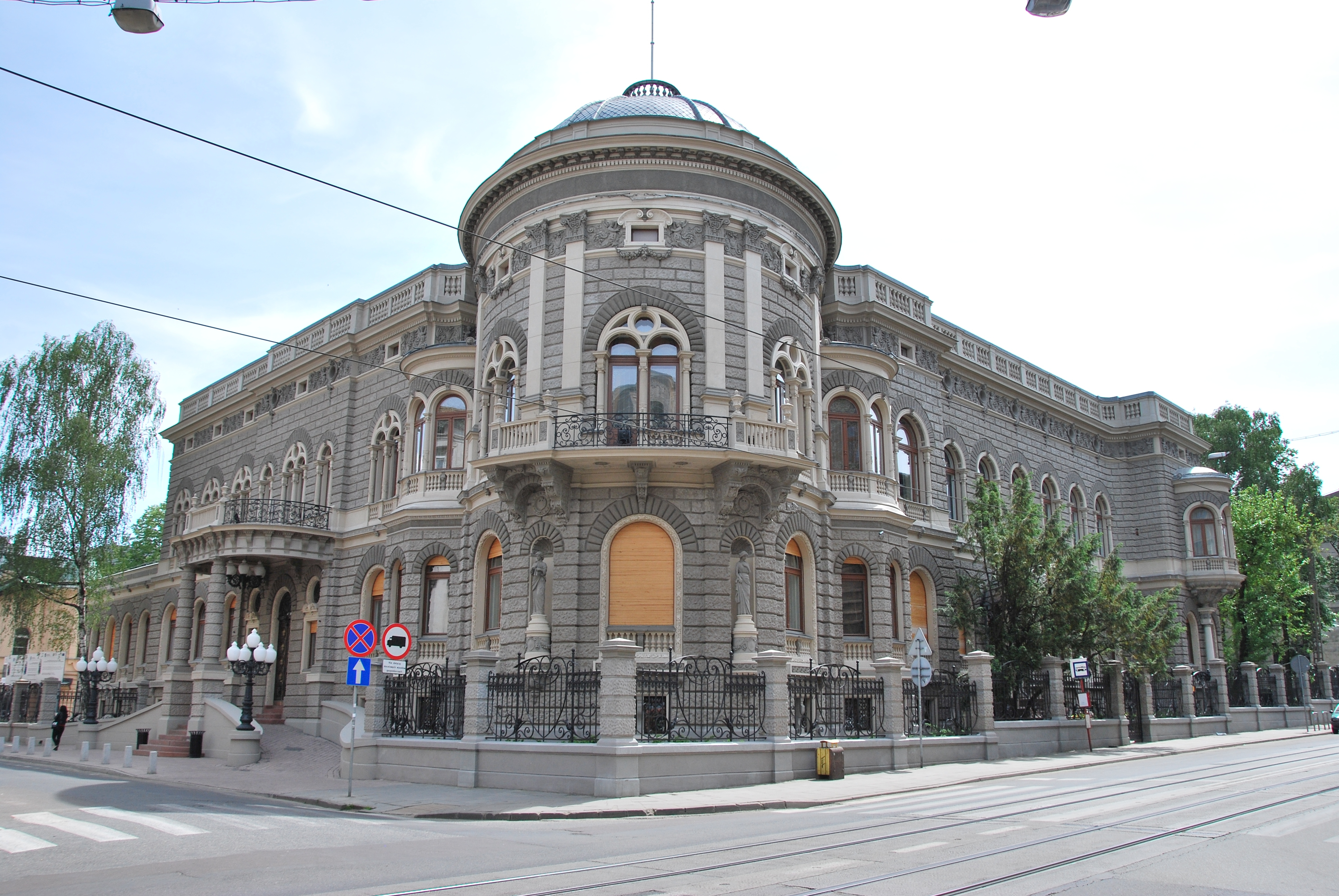
- The rectorate is housed in the Karol Poznański Palace on ul. Gdańska
- Type: public
- Established: Early 20th century
- Rector: Dr. habil. Elżbieta Aleksandrowicz
- Location: Łódź, Poland
- Website: Homepage

The Grazyna and Kiejstut Bacewicz University of Music in Łódź (Polish: Akademia Muzyczna im. Grażyny i Kiejstuta Bacewiczów w Łodzi), is a government-funded Institution of higher education in the city of Łódź, Poland. It was created at the turn of the 20th century as the Helena Kijeńska-Dobkiewicz Music Conservatory. After World War II, the Academy was reactivated as the State Conservatory of Music (April 18, 1945). It was re-structured as the Music Academy by the Act of Polish Parliament in 1982. Since 1999 it is named after one of its Rectors, as the Grażyna and Kiejstut Bacewicz University of Music.

Among the former rectors of the Academy who influenced the Polish music scene were Kazimierz Wiłkomirski (1945-1947), cellist, composer, conductor and brother of Wanda Wiłkomirska, as well as Kazimierz Sikorski (1947-1954), recipient of the Order of Polonia Restituta (1937), composer of symphonies, overtures and concertos.

The rectorate is housed in the Karol Poznański Palace on ul. Gdańska.

== Faculties ==
The structure of the University consists of four faculties:

- Creativity, Interpretation, Music Education and Production
- Instrumental Performance
- Performing Arts
- Jazz and Popular Music

Each of the faculties of the University is divided into several departments and institutes.

== Notes and references ==
Media related to Academy of Music in Łódź at Wikimedia Commons
