= Jan Sztaudynger =

Polish poet and satirist (1904–1970)

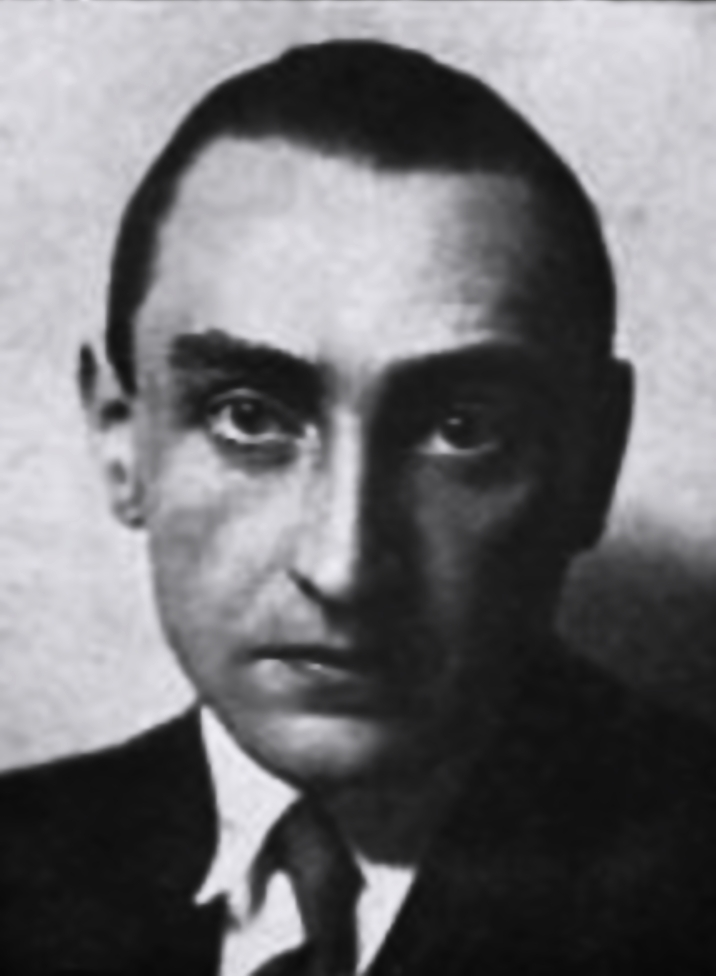
Jan Sztaudynger

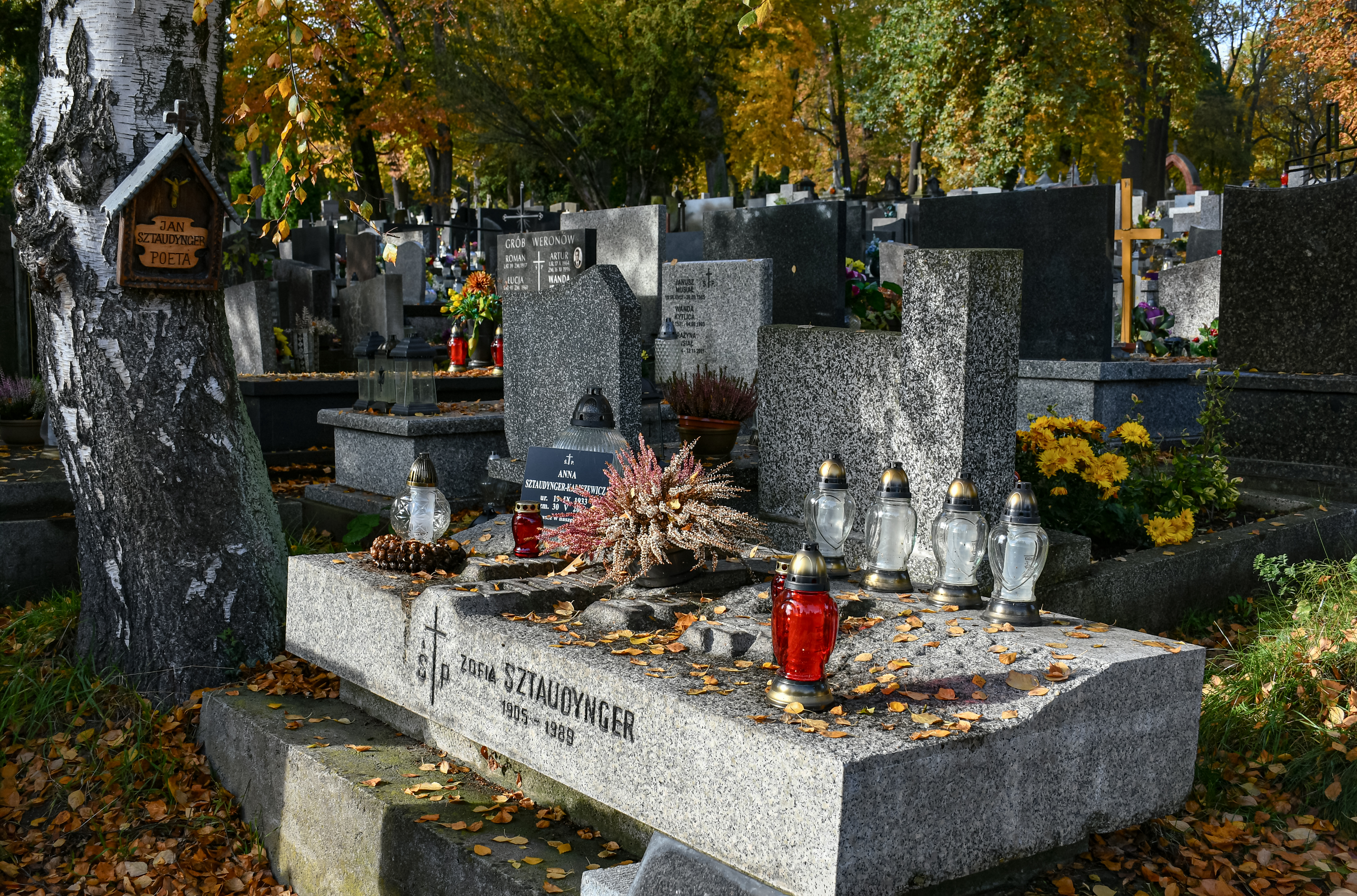
Salwator Cemetery Jan Sztaudynger grave

Jan Izydor Sztaudynger (Kraków, 28 April 1904 – 12 September 1970, Kraków) was a Polish poet and satirist who enjoyed enormous popularity after World War II.

== Life ==
Jan Sztaudynger studied Polish and German philology at Kraków's Jagiellonian University.

He is known for his epigrams, which in Poland are called fraszki (singular: fraszka). Sztaudynger called some of his epigrams piórka (singular: piórko).

In 1964 Sztaudynger published a poetry collection, Tranzytem przez Łódź (Transit through Łódź), in which he expressed nostalgia for that city's Fraszka cafe.

== See also ==
- Stanisław Jerzy Lec — contemporary writer of aphorisms
