= Mater Dolorosa cemetery =

Cemetery in Bytom, Poland

Coordinates: 50°21′15″N 18°55′11″E

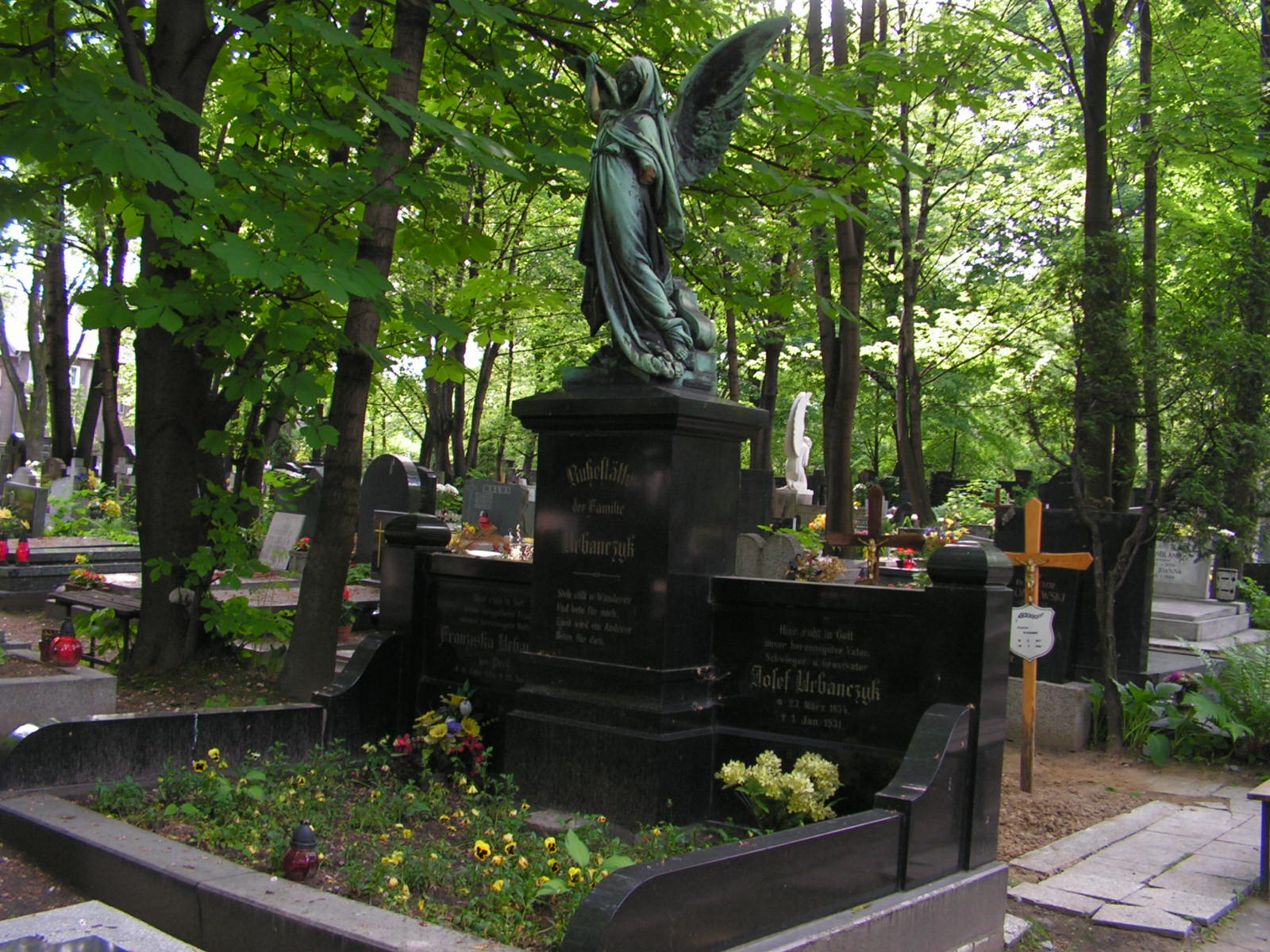
One of the tombstones at the cemetery

Mater Dolorosa (in English: Crying or Sorrowing Mother) Cemetery is a historical cemetery in Bytom, Poland. Its origins date to the 19th century, with a Neo-Gothic chapel, designed by Hugo Heer, dating from 1882. It is the most important cemetery in the city, and has been designed as a monument since 1987.

The cemetery is situated at the junction of Jainty, Kwietniewskiego and Piekarska streets, Mater Dolorosa Cemetery is Bytom's most important necropolis.

Its monuments have been recorded in a video 'walking tour'.

During a 2009 vote the cemetery was voted as one of the "Seven Architectural Wonders of the Silesian Voivodeship."
