= Karol Poznański Palace =

Former residential landmark

Coordinates: 51.7729°N 19.4487°E

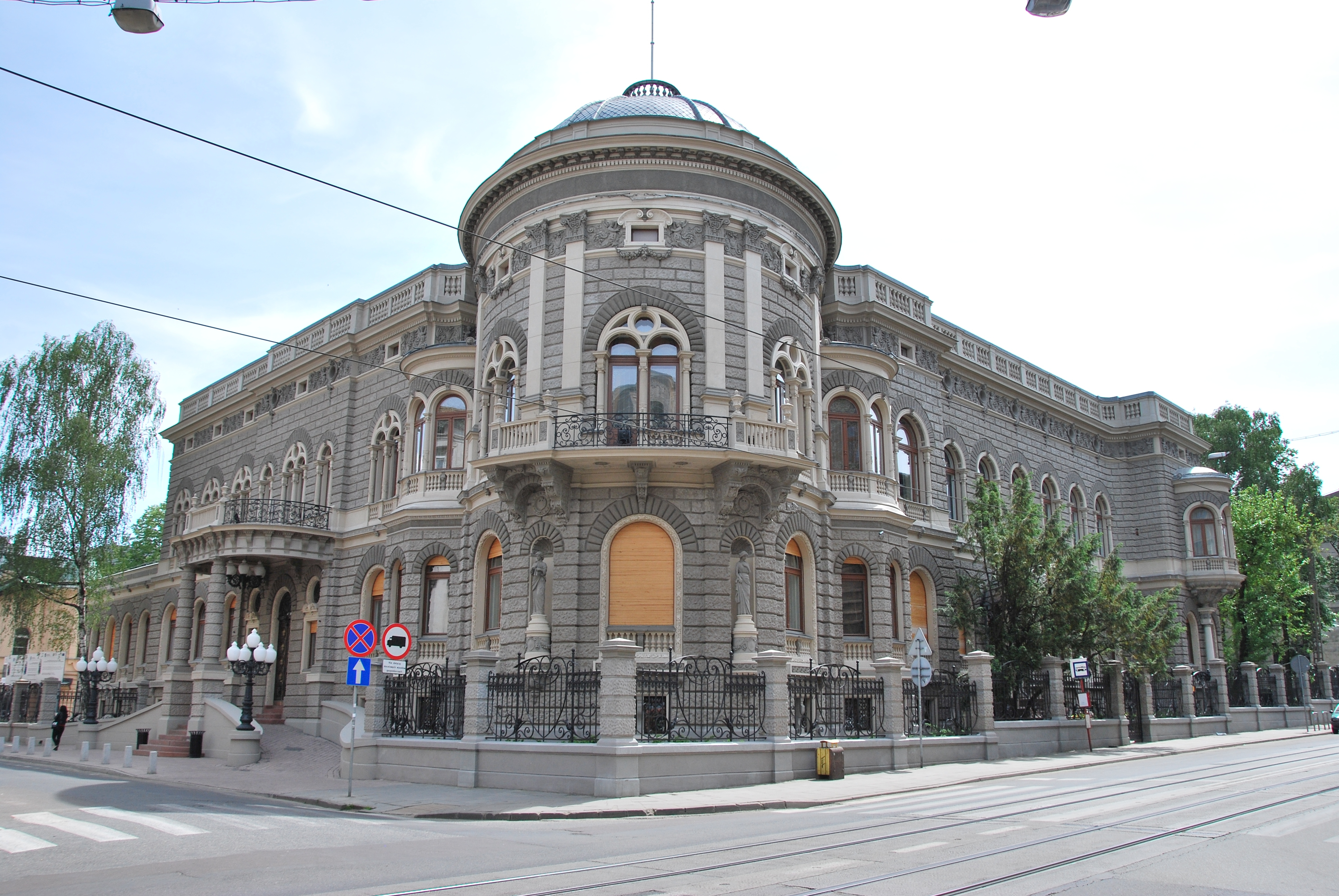
Karol Poznański Palace, today seat of the Academy of Music in Łódź

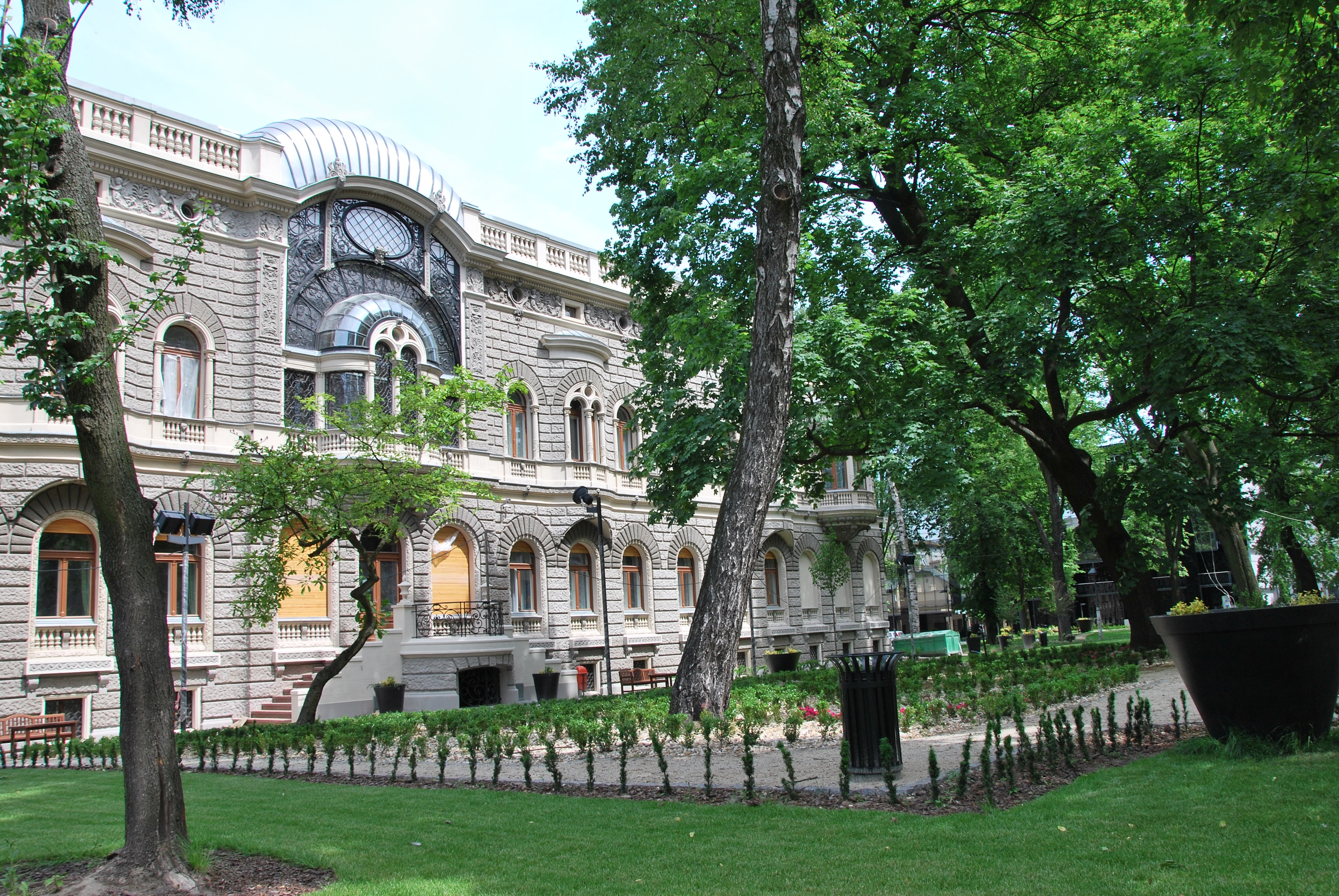
Garden of the palace

The Karol Poznański Palace is a former residence in Łódź, central Poland. It was constructed in 1904.

It houses today the rectorate of the Academy of Music in Łódź.

== See also ==
- Izrael Poznański Palace
