= Old Jewish Cemetery, Cieszyn =

Old Jewish Cemetery in Cieszyn
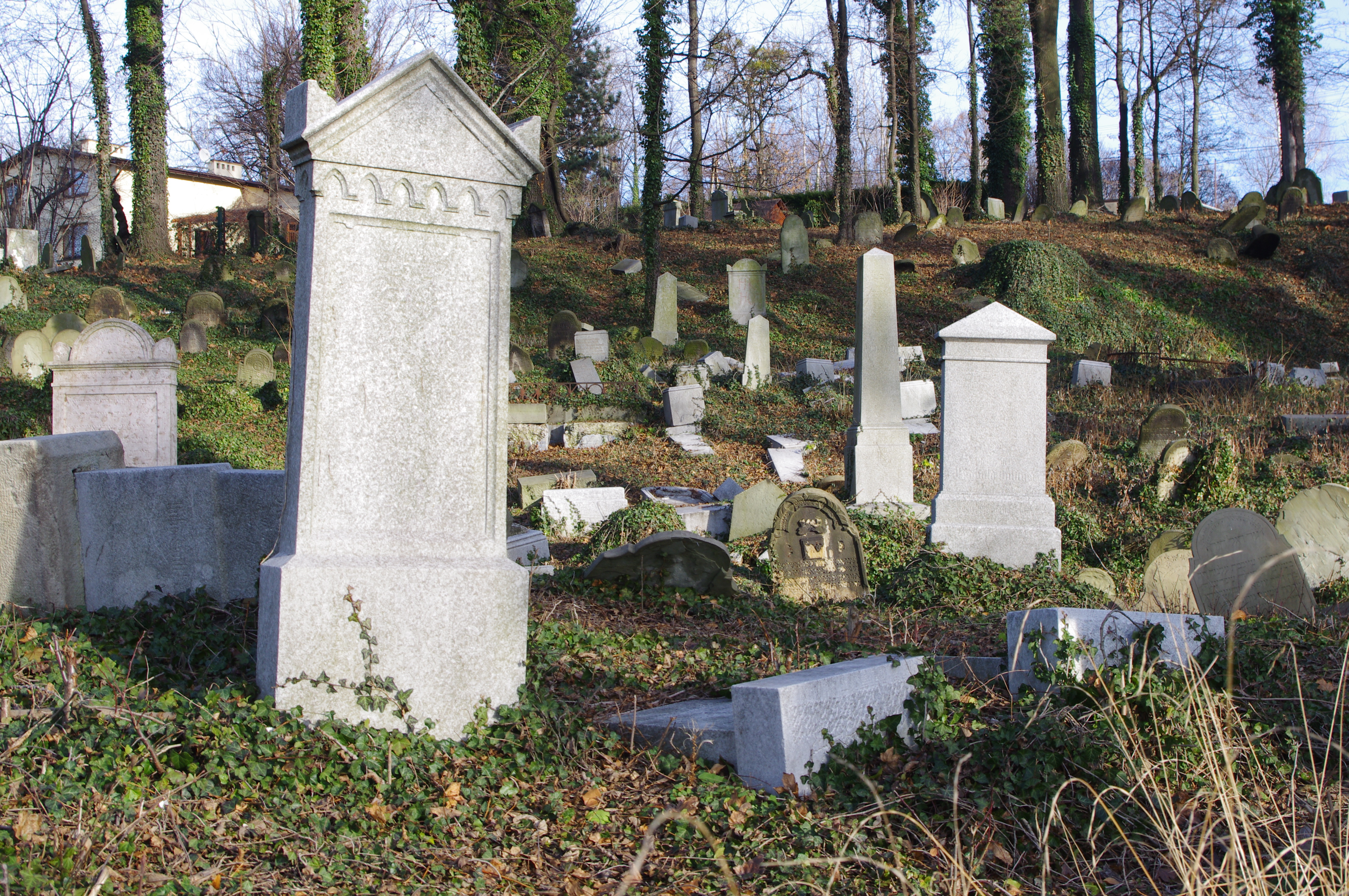
- General view of the cemetery

Details
- Established: 1647
- Location: st. Hażlaska 39, Cieszyn
- Country: Poland
- Coordinates: 49°45′23″N 18°37′43″E
- Type: Religious
- Owned by: The Jewish Community in Bielsko-Biała
- Size: 1.9 hectares
- Find a Grave: Old Jewish Cemetery in Cieszyn

Old Jewish Cemetery (Polish: Stary Cmentarz Żydowski w Cieszynie) is one of two Jewish cemeteries in Cieszyn, Poland; together with New Jewish Cemetery. Situated on Hażlaska Street 39, it is the oldest of them.

Land for the cemetery was purchased in 1647 and has since belonged to the Singer family. In 1785, the cemetery was ceased to be private property and was sold to the Jewish community in Cieszyn. The last burial at the cemetery took place in 1928. In 1986, the cemetery was added to the register of monuments. The cemetery now belongs to the Jewish Community in Bielsko-Biała.

As of 2009, the cemetery has more than 1,500 graves. The cemetery has an area of 1.9 hectares and is surrounded by a brick fence. It is claimed by local authors that the cemetery was established in the Middle Ages.

== History ==
=== Private cemetery of the Singer family ===
The origins of the cemetery are associated with Jacob Singer, founder of the oldest Jewish house and who lived permanently in Cieszyn. In 1631, he signed a lease titled "Cieszyn toll" with Princess Elizabeth Lucretia. An account of instructions dated 23 April 1647 made him a princely tax collector with extensive privileges, such as the freedom to profess Judaism and acceptance of a device family cemetery for the deceased Singer.

The same year, Jacob Singer purchased area of so-called "Winogrady" from a townsman named Jan Kraus. Winogrady became the nucleus of today's cemetery. Singer was first buried there, but his grave did not survive to modern times. Following the edict of Charles VI in 1713, there was a tolerance of the influx of Jewish population into the town. As a result, the supply of cemetery plots decreased more rapidly than before. In 1715, in the absence of burial sites, the Singers bought a parcel of land and its house from Jan Faber, and in 1723, a portion of a field from Susan Berisch. The building obtained an embedded servant who looked after the cemetery.

At the time of Maria Theresa, the cemetery was widely used by the Jews from Cieszyn and surrounding areas. In 1768, the Singers (Hirschel Singer and his sister, Endel, widow of Jacob Oppenheimie) again enlarged the cemetery through the purchase of an adjacent garden of a former folwark. They maintained a gravedigger during that period, and high charges were levied on burials, although annually 20 poor Jews were buried on their own account with the addition of garb.

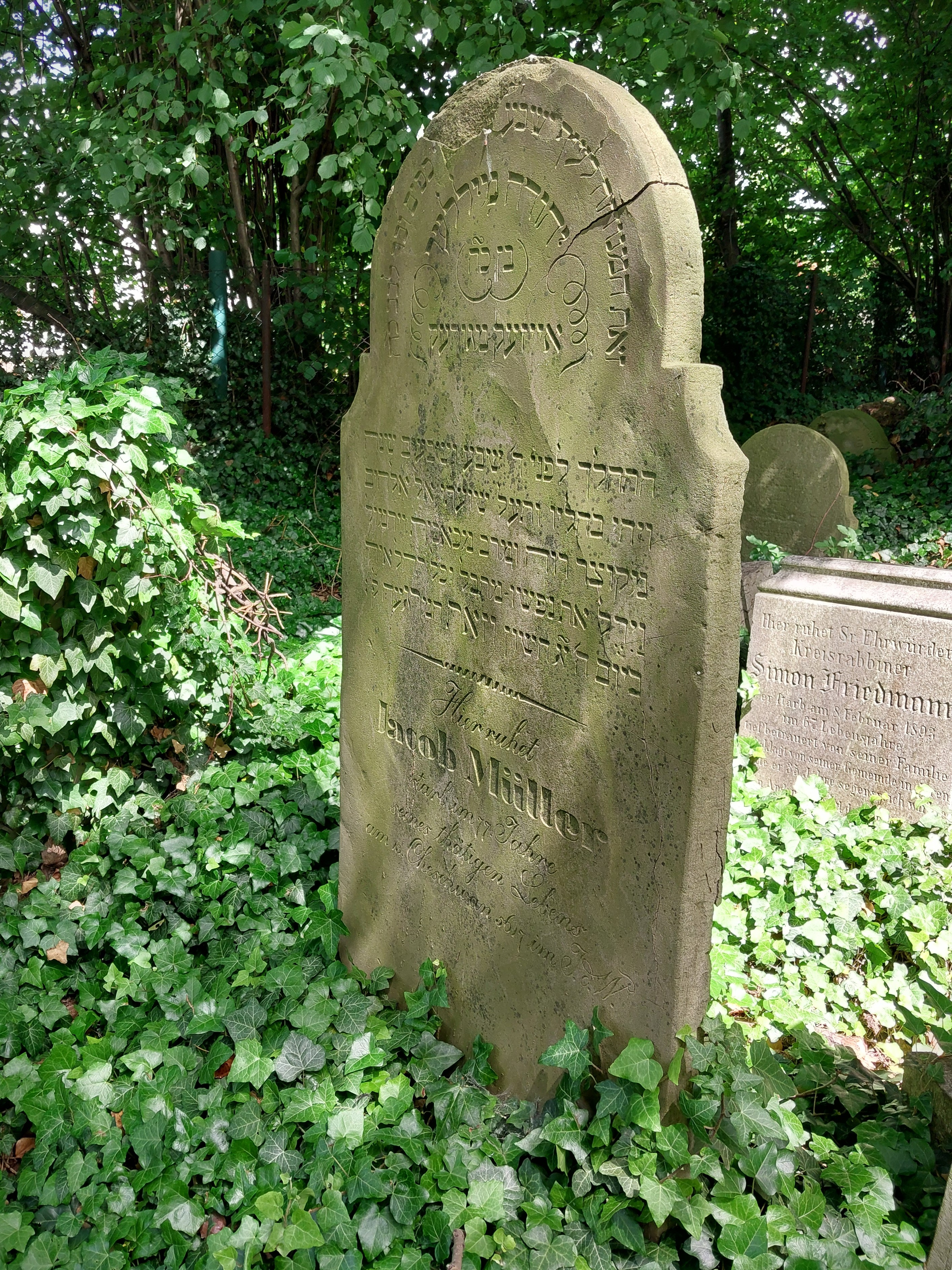
Bilingual gravestone

=== Cemetery owned by the municipality ===
On 31 March 1785, Moses Hirschel Singer sold the property to 88 Jewish families in Cieszyn for 900 florins and the cemetery ceased being private. The cemetery was expanded; a plot was purchased from Paul Płoszka in 1802, and a quarried section of land was purchased from the quarry in 1836, when the cemetery reached its final shape. Around 1820, a hospital for poor Jews was built at the cemetery, and in 1830, the cemetery was surrounded by a brick wall. In the second half of the 19th century, a funeral house, a flat for the guards and stables for horses and hearse were built and still exist today. The building was a gift from Emanuel A. Ziffer, an Australian railway specialist, and was dedicated to the memory of his parents, according to the board.

== Bibliography ==
- Janusz Spyra, Stary cmentarz żydowski w Cieszynie [The old Jewish cemetery in Cieszyn], "Kalendarz Cieszyński 1997", Cieszyn 1996, pp. 92–95
- Heinrich Berger,Zur Geschichte des jüdischen Friedhofs in Teschen. Monatsschrift für Geschichte und Wissenschaft des Judentums, 1895–1896, Heft 1, S. 37–40.
- Żydowskie zabytki Cieszyna i Czeskiego Cieszyna [Jewish monuments of Cieszyn and Český Těšín] edited by Janusz Spyra, 1999 ISBN 83-908299-8-3
- Żydzi w Polsce. Dzieje i kultura – leksykon [The Jews in Poland. The history and culture-encyclopedia], 2001, ISBN 83-86859-58-X
- Burchard Przemysław (1990). Souvenirs and Jewish monuments in Poland. Warsaw. pp. 199–200.
