= Hercules Fighting with a Centaur =

1916 modernist and neoclassicist sculpture in Szczecin, Poland

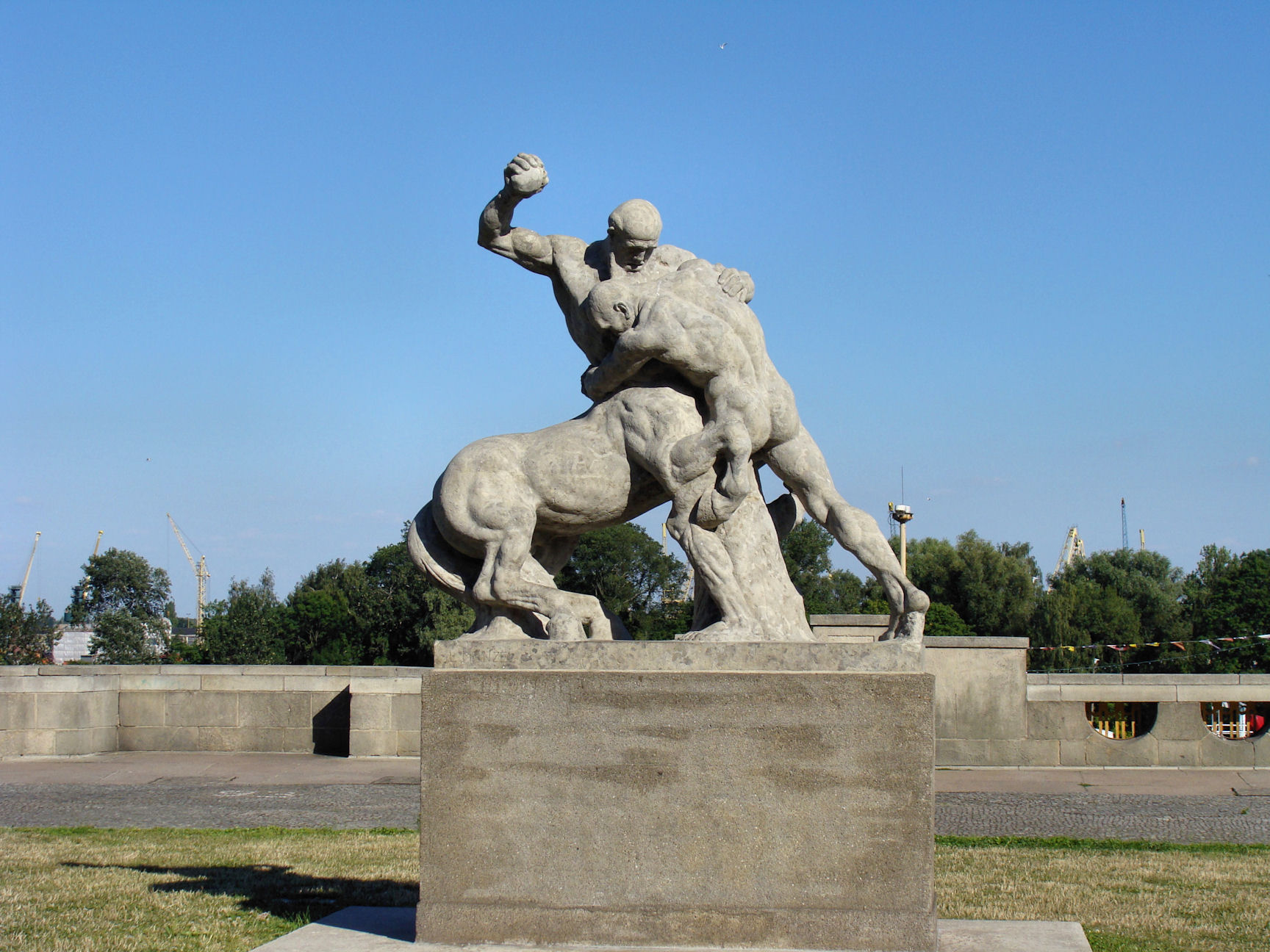
- The statue in 2010.
- Interactive map of Hercules Fighting with a Centaur
- Location: Bolesław I the Brave Embankment Street, Old Town, Szczecin, Poland
- Coordinates: 53°25′47″N 14°33′57″E
- Designer: Ludwig Manzel
- Type: Statue
- Material: Sandstone (statue); concrete (pedestal)
- Length: 2.5 m (8 ft 2 in)
- Width: 2.4 m (7 ft 10 in)
- Height: 2.4 m (statue); 3.25 m (total)
- Opening date: 1916

Hercules Fighting with a Centaur (Polish: Herkules walczący z centaurem; German: Herkules im Kampf mit dem Zentauren), also known as The Fight of a Lapith with a Centaur (Polish: Walka Lapity z centaurem; German: Der Kampf eines Lapithen mit dem Zentauren), is a 1916 sandstone sculpture by Ludwig Manzel, displayed in Szczecin, Poland, within the neighbourhood of Old Town. It is placed at the Bolesław I the Brave Embankment in front of the Main Building of Szczecin National Museum. Created in modernist style with allusions to the neoclassicical movement, it depicts two figures embraces in a combat, between a naked, muscular man, and a male centaur, a creature from the Greek mythology with the upper body of a human and the lower body and legs of a horse. The human is interpreted by art critics and historians as either Hercules, a demigod of strength and adventurer in the Roman mythology, or a Lapith, a member of a group of legendary people in the Greek mythology, who fought a battle against centaurs, known as the Centauromachy.

== History ==
The artwork was founded by Kisker, a consul in Szczecin. It was sculptured by Ludwig Manzel, and unveiled in 1916, in front of the building of the Szczecin Municipal Museum, opened in 1914, which now houses the Szczecin National Museum.

== Characteristics ==
The statue is from sandstone in modernist style with allusions to the neoclassicical movement. It depicts two figures embraces in a combat, between a naked, muscular man, and a male centaur, a creature from the Greek mythology with the upper body of a human and the lower body and legs of a horse. The man embraces his opponent, who is preparing to hit him with a rock. The human is interpreted by art critics and historians as either Hercules, a demigod of strength and adventurer in the Roman mythology, or a Lapith, a member of a group of legendary people in the Greek mythology, who fought a battle against centaurs, known as the Centauromachy. The statue has a height of 2.4 m, and is placed on a cuboid concrete pedestal, with the dimensions of 2.4 × 2.5 × 0.85 m. The statue is displayed at the Bolesław I the Brave Embankment in front of the Main Building of Szczecin National Museum.
