= Memorial to the Heroes of January '71 =

Monument in Szczecin, Poland

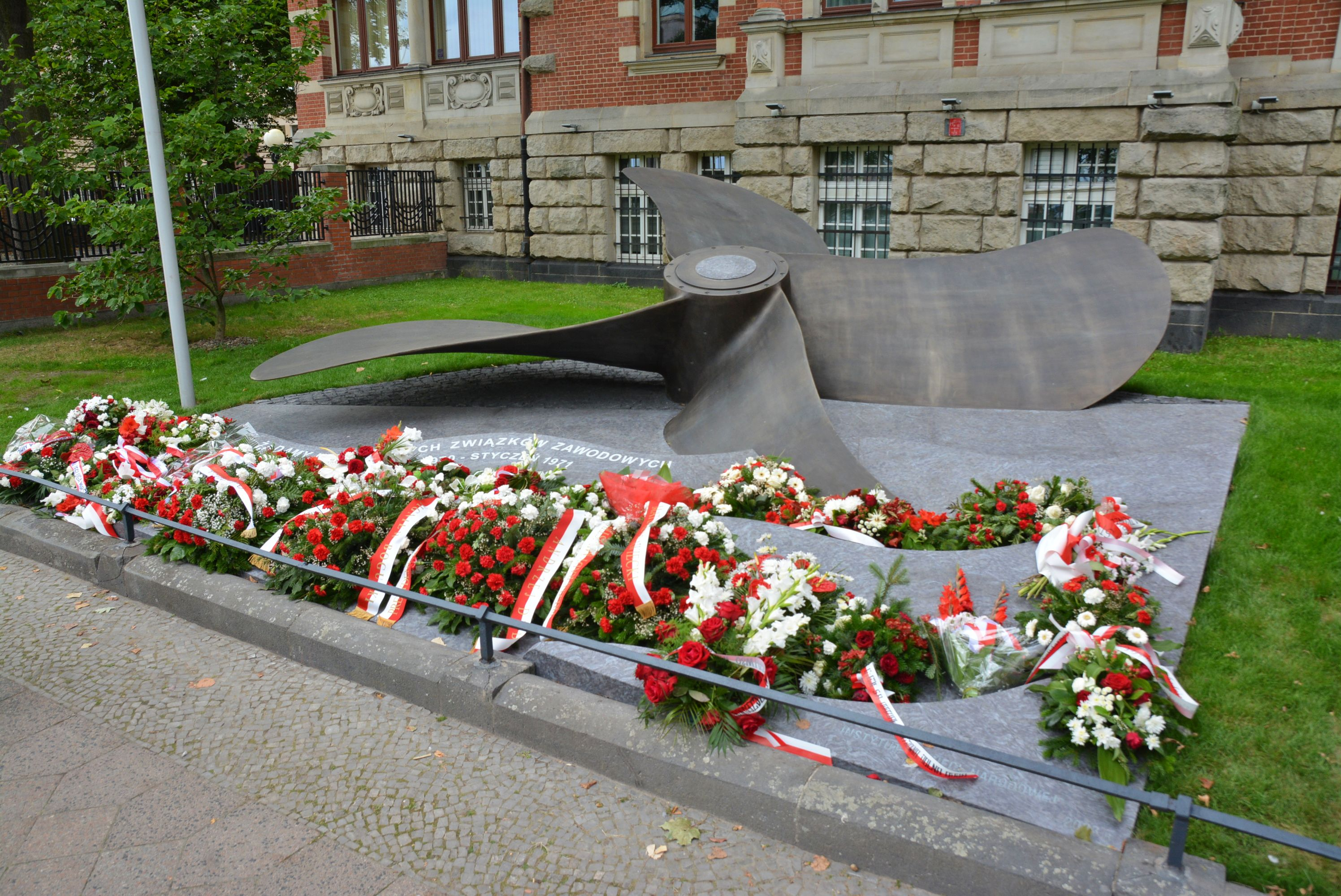
- The monument in 2023.
- Interactive map of Memorial to the Heroes of January '71
- Location: 4 Bolesław I the Brave Embankment Street, Old Town, Szczecin, Poland
- Coordinates: 53.430733°N 14.565797°E
- Type: Sculpture
- Width: 7 m (23 ft)
- Opening date: 30 August 2023
- Dedicated to: Participants of the January 1971 protests in Szczecin

The Memorial to the Heroes of January '71 (Polish: Pomnik Bohaterów Stycznia ’71) is a monument in Szczecin, Poland, within the Old Town neighbourhood. It is placed in front of the West Pomeranian Voivodeship Office Building, at the Bolesław I the Brave Embankment. It takes a form of a large metal ship propeller, embedded into pavement. The monument is dedicated to the participants of protests held in January 1971 in Szczecin, Poland, which were caused by the government's failure to reduce prices, as they had promised at the end of the previous protests in December 1970, as well as against the censorship and smear campaigns of the media towards those events. The monument was unveiled on 30 August 2023.

== History ==
The monument was dedicated to the participants of protects in January 1971, in Szczecin, Poland in, held response to government failing to failure to keep promises to reduce prices agreed upon the end of the previous protests in December 1970, as well as against the censorship and smear campaigns of the media towards those events. The monument was unveiled on 30 August 2023, by President of Poland Andrzej Duda, celebrating the 4th anniversary of the signing of the August Agreements. It was proposed by West Pomeranian Division of the Solidarity trade union, and the Association of December '70 and January '71. Its main element has a form of a 8-ton ship propeller, which was donated by the Polish Maritime Shipping, from its bulk carrier MS Solidarność.

== Design ==
The main element of the monument is a metal ship propeller, which has a diameter of 7 meters, and weights 8 tones. It came from bulk carrier MS Solidarność. It is embedded into the pavement, which is stylized to evoke water waves. It bears an inscription in Polish, with a quotation from demands send by 1971 protestors to the government. It reads:

Polish inscription

Żądamy niezależnych związków zawodowych
Grudzień 1970 – Styczeń 1971

Translation:
English translation

We demand independent trade unions
December 1970 – January 1971

The monument is placed in front of the West Pomeranian Voivodeship Office Building, at the Bolesław I the Brave Embankment, and near the corner with Szczerbowa Street.
