= Friedrich Ackermann =

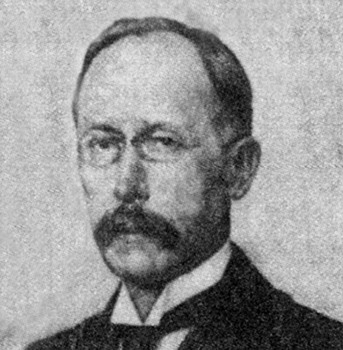
- Friedrich Ackermann.

High mayor of Szczecin
- In office 1 April 1907 – 9 April 1931
- Preceded by: Hermann Haken
- Succeeded by: Hans Poeschel

Member of the Provincial Parliament of the Province of Pomerania
- In office 1910–1931

Member of the Prussian House of Lords
- In office 1907–1918

Mayor of Rathenow
- In office 1907–1907

Personal details
- Born: 25 December 1866 Bądle, Kingdom of Prussia (now part of Poland)
- Died: 9 April 1931 (aged 64) Szczecin, Weimar Republic (now part of Poland)
- Resting place: Central Cemetery, Szczecin, Poland
- Party: German People's Party
- Occupation: Politician; Jurist

Friedrich Ackermann (25 December 1866 – 9 April 1931; German: [ˈfʁiː.dʁɪç ˈakɐˌman]) was a politician and jurist, who from 1907 to 1931, was the high mayor of Szczecin, Poland (then part of Germany).

== Biography ==
Friedrich Ackermann was born on 25 December 1866 in Bądle, a village then in the Province of Prussia, Kingdom of Prussia, and now located within the Warmian–Masurian Voivodeship, Poland. He came from a family of civil servants from Mecklenburg, and was related via marriage to the merchant families in Gdańsk. His father was Friedrich Ackermann, an estate owner, and his mother was Johanna Ackermann (née Steffens).

He was taught by private tutors, and later attended upper classes a gymnasium in Jelenia Góra, from which he graduated in 1885. At first he studied natural science in Zürich, Switzerland, and from 1886, he studied law in Munich, Leipzig, and Göttingen, and graduated with a doctorate in jurisprudence.

After graduation, he did a military service for a year, and became judicial trainee in 1890, and a judicial assessor in West Prussia in 1885. In 1896, he became a councillor in Gdańsk, and in 1907 he was a mayor of Rathenow for three months.

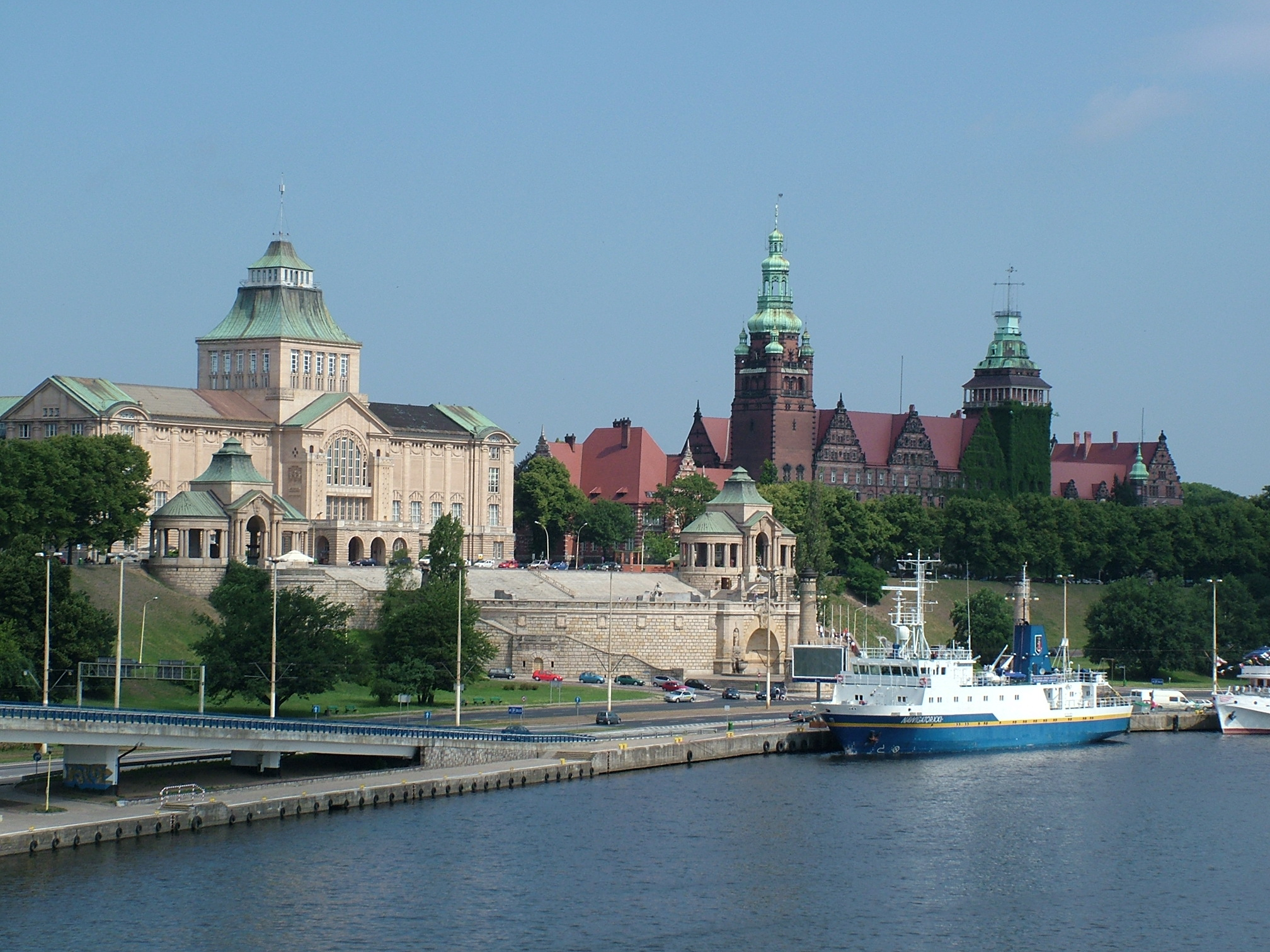
The Bolesław I the Brave Embankment and the building of the National Museum in Szczecin, opened in 1912 and 1913, under the administration of Friedrich Ackermann.

On 1 April 1907 he became the high mayor of Szczecin, Kingdom of Prussia, German Empire (now part of Poland). He held the office for over 23 years, until his death in 1931. During this time he strove to maintain the city's high position, and develop new areas. He had modernised the seaport and transport network. The city also expanded incorporating modern neighbourhoods of Pogodno, Świerczewo, and Niebuszewo, and in Pogodno was developed a residencial estate of villas, nicknamed Ackermannshöhe in recognition of the mayor's efforts. Under his administration were also opened the Haken Terrace (now the Bolesław I the Brave Embankment ), Quistorp Park (now Kasprowicz Park), Central Cemetery, and the Municipal Museum (its building now serving as headquarters of the Szczecin National Museum).

As the mayor, he represented the city in the Prussian House of Lords from 1907 to 1918. He was also a long-standing member of the Provincial Parliament of the Province of Pomerania from 1910 to 1931. There, from 1910 to 1920 he was a representative of the city of Szczecin, and following the change in the electoral law in 1921, he was a member from the list of the German People's Party. From 1910 to 1920 and from 1926 to 1929, he held the office of the parliamentary deputy chairperson, and from 1930 to 1931, a second deputy chairperson.

Ackermann died on 9 April 1931 in Szczecin, and was buried at the Central Cemetery. His grave did not survive to the present day. On 18 April 1931, he was posthumously given the title of the honorary citizen of the city.

== Private life ==
Ackermann was married twice, to Gertruda Ackermann, and Helena Ackermann. He had four children from his first marriage, and five from the second.

== Legacy ==
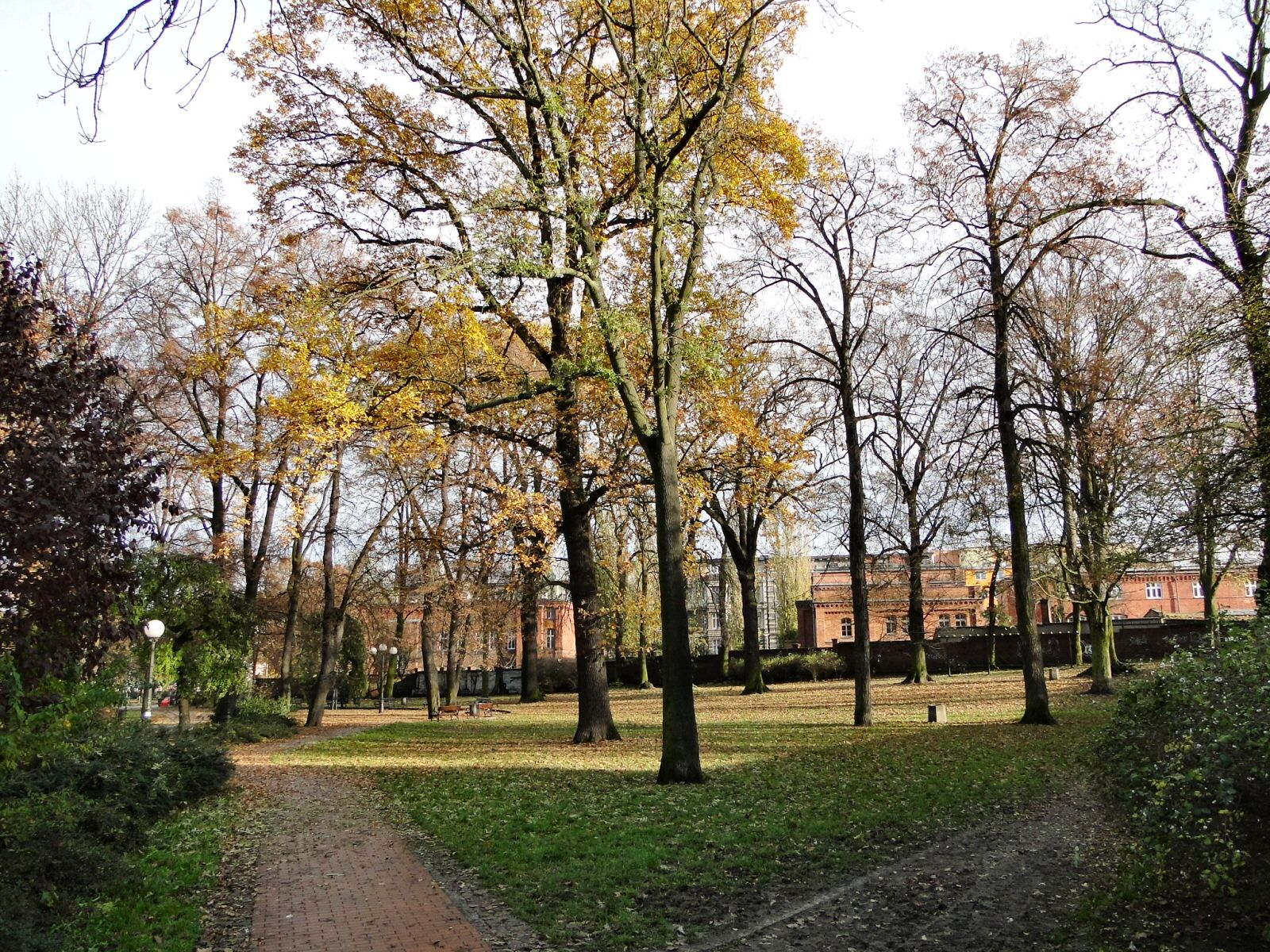
The Ackermann Square in Szczecin, in 2009

In 2001 a garden square in Szczecin at the intersection of Mikołaja Kopernika Street and Bolesława Krzywoustego Street, was named the Friedrich Ackermann Square (Polish: skwer Friedricha Ackermanna). A part of the modern neighbourhood of Łękno, which was developed under his administration, was in the past called Ackermannshöhe (from German: Ackermann Hill).

In 2000, he was placed third on the Szczecin inhabitants of the century, a list that included the 79 most outstanding inhabitants of the city in years 1900–2000, based on the referendum organized by the Szczecin edition of Gazeta Wyborcza, Polish Radio Szczecin, and TVP3 Szczecin. He received 4102 votes, and placed after Hermann Haken, and Piotr Zaremba.
