= Hermann Haken (politician) =

Lord mayor of Stettin, Prussia (1828–1916)

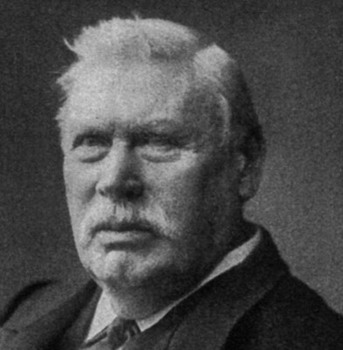
- Hermann Haken.

High mayor of Stettin
- In office 1 January 1878 – 31 March 1907
- Preceded by: Theodor Eduard Burscher
- Succeeded by: Friedrich Ackermann

Member of the Prussian House of Lords from Stettin
- In office 1895–1907

Member of the Prussian House of Representatives
- In office 1873–1878

Mayor of Kolberg
- In office 1867–1877

Personal details
- Born: 3 March 1828 Köslin, Kingdom of Prussia (now Koszalin, Poland)
- Died: 16 June 1916 (aged 88) Stettin, Kingdom of Prussia, German Empire (now Szczecin, Poland)
- Party: National Liberal Party
- Spouse: Johanna Haken
- Education: University of Greifswald; Humboldt University of Berlin

Hermann Haken (German: [ˈhɛʁ.man ˈhaːkŋ̩]; 3 May 1828 – 16 July 1916) was a lawyer and politician, most notable as a high mayor of city of Stettin, Kingdom of Prussia (now Szczecin, Poland). During his 29-year term in office lasting from 1878 to 1907, he developed Stettin into a modern city and one of the most important industrial and port cities in the region of Baltic Sea.

He also served as the mayor of Kolberg, Kingdom of Prussia (now Kołobrzeg, Poland) between 1867 and 1877, as a member of Prussian House of Representatives between 1873 and 1878, and as the representative of Stettin in Prussian House of Lords between 1895 and 1907. He was a member of the National Liberal Party.

== History ==
Haken was born on 3 May 1828 in Köslin, Kingdom of Prussia (now Koszalin, Poland). He studied jurisprudence at University of Greifswald and Humboldt University of Berlin. In 1847 he became a member of the Corps Pomerania Greifswald, a student association. He was a member of National Liberal Party. Between 1867 and 1877 he was a mayor of Kolberg, Kingdom of Prussia (now Kołobrzeg, Poland). During his term he established mineral spa in the town and in 1877 he was granted the honorary citizenship of the Kolberg. In addition to his local political activities, between 1873 and 1878 he was a member of the Prussian House of Representatives. He was married to Johanna Haken.

On 1 January 1878, Haken became high mayor of Stettin, Kingdom of Prussia (now Szczecin, Poland). In his office he developed Stettin into a large modern city and in significant way rearranged the urban layout and infrastructure. The seaport was expanded and adapted to the needs of the industrial era. He introduced the roundabouts to city's road infrastructure and was initiator of the public library and Central Cemetery. From his initiative, between 1882 and 1910, a Gründerzeit-style district was built to the west of the old town. Between 1902 and 1921 he initiated building of the observation deck in place of abandoned Fort Leopold in north of the old town, named in his memory after his death Haken Terrace (now known as Chrobry Embankment). It was a representative promenade with wide stairs to the bank of the Oder river. During his term the developed districts of Pommerensdorf (now Pomorzany), Zabelsdorf (now Niebuszewo), Westend (now Łękno) and Bredow (now Drzetowo) while Grabow (now Grabowo) was added.

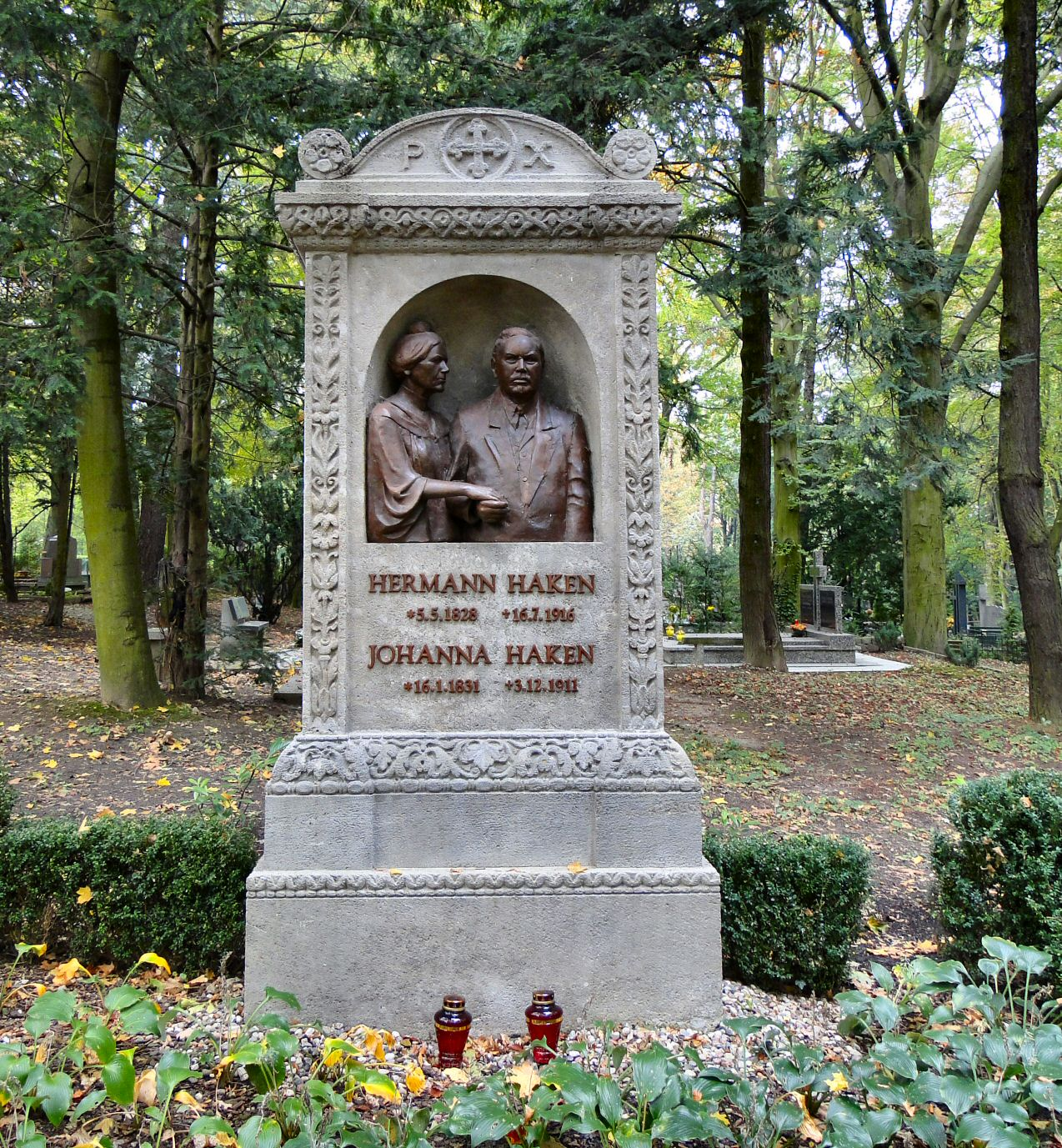
Tombstone of Hermann and Johanna Haken in Central Cemetery, Szczecin.

Haken represented the city of Stettin in the Prussian House of Lords between 1895 and until his retirement in 1907. He stopped being high mayor of Stettin on 31 March 1907 and was succeeded by Friedrich Ackermann. On the same day he was granted honorary citizenship of the city. He died on 16 July 1916 in Stettin and was buried at Central Cemetery.

== Legacy ==
After his death, the observation deck, which contraction was initiated by him, was named in his memory Haken Terrace (now known as Chrobry Embankment).

In 2000, he was listed on the second place on the Szczecinianie stulecia (from Polish: Szczecin inhabitants of the century), that listed the 79 most outstanding inhabitants of the city in years 1900–2000, based on the referendum organized by the Szczecin edition of the Gazeta Wyborcza, Polskie Radio Szczecin, and TVP3 Szczecin. He received 6694 votes, and placed after Piotr Zaremba with 8180 votes.

One of Szczecin roundabouts was named after him Hakena Roundabout (Polish: Rondo Hakena), with a shopping centre named after it Rondo Hakena Park, being opened in 2020 nearby.

== Orders and decorations ==
- Knight of the Order of the Red Eagle, 2nd Class, 1887; with Star, 23 September 1898; with Oak Leaves and Crown
- Knight of the Royal Order of the Crown, 4th Class with Commemorative Band; 2nd Class with Star
- Knight of the Imperial Order of the Iron Crown, 2nd Class
- Commander of the Albert Order, 2nd Class

== Bibliography ==
- Stettiner Persönlichkeiten (24): Hermann Haken, ehemaliger Oberbürgermeister der Stadt Stettin by Horst Kramp. Stettiner Bürgerbrief issue 28. 2002, ISSN 1619-6201, pages 39–42.
- Hermann Haken jako burmistrz Kołobrzegu i nadburmistrz Szczecina by Edward Włodarczyk. Zeszyty Naukowe Uniwersytetu Szczecińskiego / Szczecińskie Studia Historyczne 234=11 (1998), pages 69–80
- Stettiner Lebensbilder (= Veröffentlichungen der Historischen Kommission für Pommern. Reihe V, Band 40) by Eckhard Wendt. Böhlau, Köln/Weimar/Wien 2004, ISBN 3-412-09404-8, pages 221–223
