= Theodor Eduard Burscher =

Prussian official

High mayor of Stettin
- In office 1868 – 9 May 1877
- Preceded by: Karl Hering
- Succeeded by: Hermann Haken

High mayor of Elbing
- In office 1853–1868
- Preceded by: Adolph Philipps
- Succeeded by: Johann Carl Adolph Selke

Personal details
- Born: 1818 Cottbus, Kingdom of Prussia (now part of Germany)
- Died: 9 May 1877 (aged 58–59) Stettin, Kingdom of Prussia (now Szczecin, Poland)
- Spouse: Ernestine Friederike Natalie Thusnelde Adelheid Burscher
- Children: Elise Caroline Laura Adelheid Burscher

Theodor Eduard Burscher (German: [ˈteˈoːdoːʁ ˈeːˌdu̯aːrt ˈbʊrʃɐ]), also known as Theodor Konrad Burscher (German: [ˈteˈoːdoːʁ ˈkɔnʁaːt ˈbʊrʃɐ]), (Note: The documents from the time of his office as the high mayor of Elbląg note him as Theodor Konrad Burscher, while the later documents, from the time of his office as the high mayor of Szczecin, note him as Theodor Eduard Burscher.) (1818 – 9 May 1877), was politician, who served as the high mayor of the city of Elbing, Kingdom of Prussia (now Elbląg, Poland) from 1853 to 1868, and the high mayor of the city of Stettin, Kingdom of Prussia (now Szczecin, Poland), from 1868 to 1877.

== History ==
Burscher was born in 1818, in Cottbus, Kingdom of Prussia (now part of Germany). He was the son Gottlieb Burscher and Caroline Burscher (née Selling), and was of Protestant faith. He was married to Ernestine Friederike Natalie Thusnelde Adelheid Burscher (née Belian). Together, they had daughter, Elise Caroline Laura Adelheid Burscher, who was born on 9 October 1856, in Trautzig, Kingdom of Prussia (now part of Olsztyn, Poland).

In 1853, he became the high mayor of the city of Elbing, Kingdom of Prussia (now Elbląg, Poland). His yąearly salary was 2000 Reichsthaler. He remained in the office until 1868, when he resigned, to become the high mayor of the city of Stettin, Kingdom of Prussia (now Szczecin, Poland). He died in office, on 9 May 1877, around 10:30, in the Old Town Hall in Stettin.
