= Hans Poeschel =

German politician (1881–1960)

High mayor of Mönchengladbach
- In office 1933–1937
- Preceded by: Wilhelm Pelzer
- Succeeded by: Werner Keyßner

High mayor of Szczecin
- In office 1931–1933
- Preceded by: Friedrich Ackermann
- Succeeded by: Wilhelm Stuckart

District president of the Liegnitz Governmental District
- In office 1925–1931
- Preceded by: Robert Büchting
- Succeeded by: Hans Simons

Administrator of the Randow District
- In office 1921–1923
- Preceded by: Rudolf Junkermann
- Succeeded by: Ernst von Harnack

Personal details
- Born: 20 September 1881 Grimma, Kingdom of Saxony, German Empire (now part of Germany)
- Died: 2 July 1960 (aged 78) Munich, West Germany (now part of Germany)

Military service
- Allegiance: German Empire
- Branch/service: Imperial German Army
- Years of service: 1914–1918
- Battles/wars: First World War

Hans Poeschel (German: [ˈhans ˈpœʃl̩]; 20 September 1881 – 2 June 1960) was a German politician and statesman. He was the high mayor of Szczecin from 1931 to 1933, and the high mayor of Mönchengladbach from 1933 to 1937.

== Biography ==
Hans Poeschel was born on 20 September 1920, in Grimma, Kingdom of Saxony, German Empire (now part of Germany).

He studied in Leipzig, and was a member of the German Student Association. From 1911 to 1914, he worked in the German colonial administration. Then, he served in the Imperial German Army during the First World War. In 1919, he was a councillor in the Imperial Colonial Office, and later in the Foreign Office.

In 1920, he was transferred to the Supreme President Office in Kaliningrad (then known as Königsberg). In 1921 he was appointed the administrator of the Randow District in the Province of Pomerania. From 1923 to 1925 he was a deputy government president of Frankfurt an der Oder, and from 1925 to 1931, he was the district president of the Liegnitz Governmental District. From 1931 to 1933 he was the high mayor of Szczecin, and from 1933 to 1937, the high mayor of Mönchengladbach.

He died on 2 June 1960 in Munich, West Germany (now part of Germany).
