= West Pomeranian Voivodeship Office Building =

Coordinates: 53°25′53″N 14°33′58″E

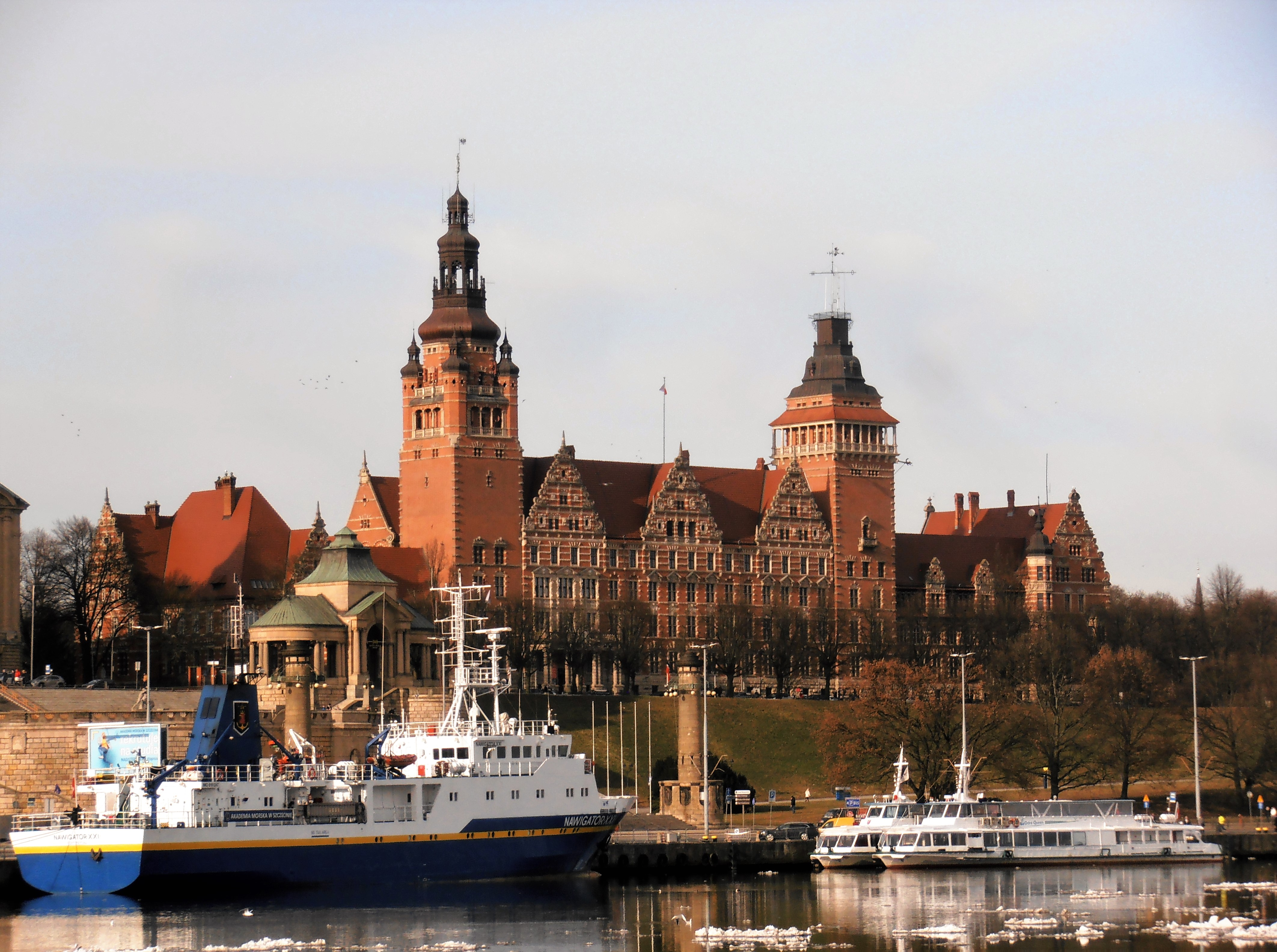
- View from Oder river
- Interactive map of the West Pomeranian Voivodeship Office Building area

General information
- Location: Szczecin, Poland
- Completed: 1911

Design and construction
- Architect: Paul Kieschke

West Pomeranian Voivodeship Office Building (Polish: Gmach Zachodniopomorskiego Urzędu Wojewódzkiego) is a historic administrative building, opened in 1911 and located at the Chrobry Embankment in the city of Szczecin, Poland.

== History ==
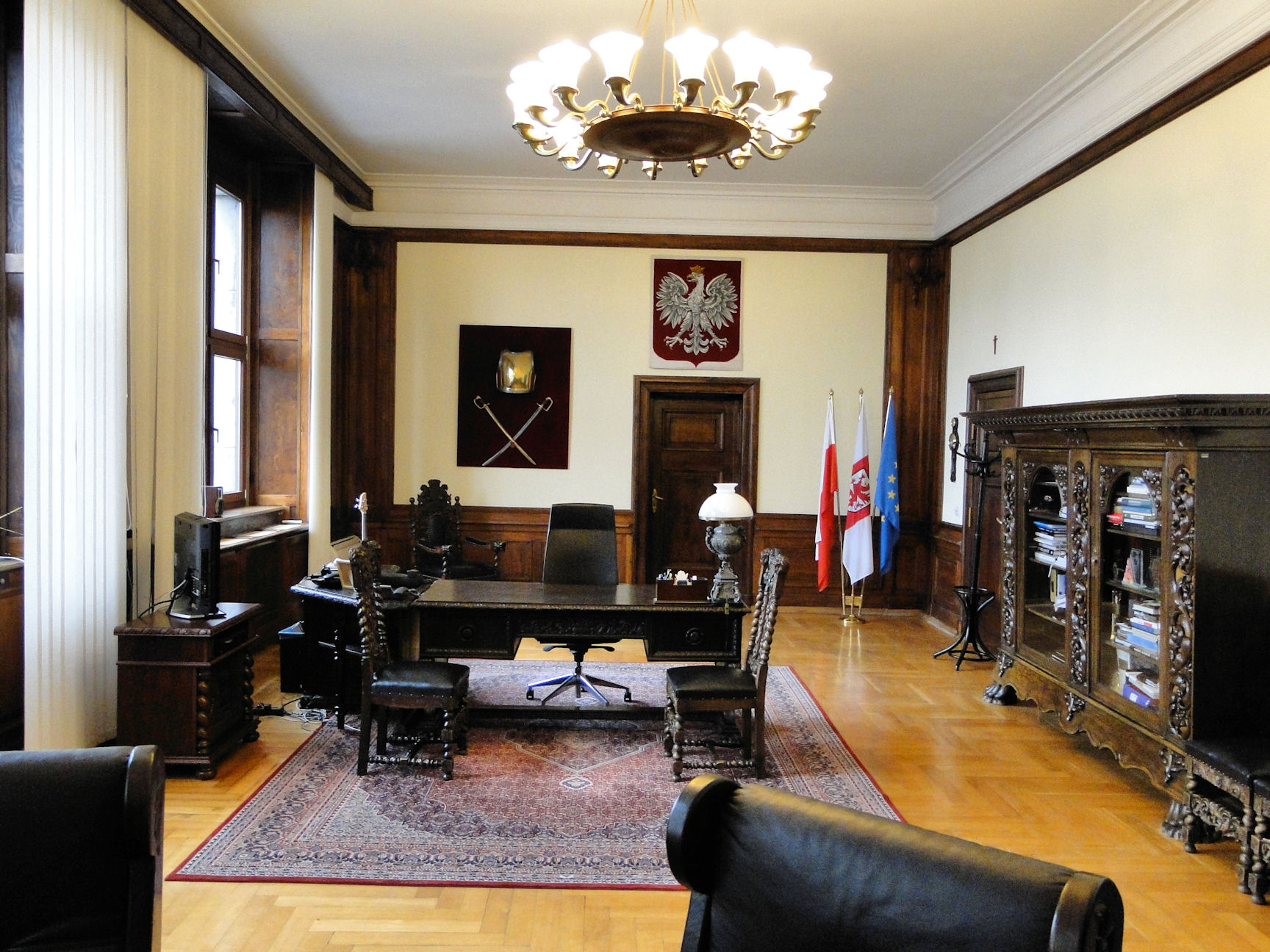
Governor's Cabinet

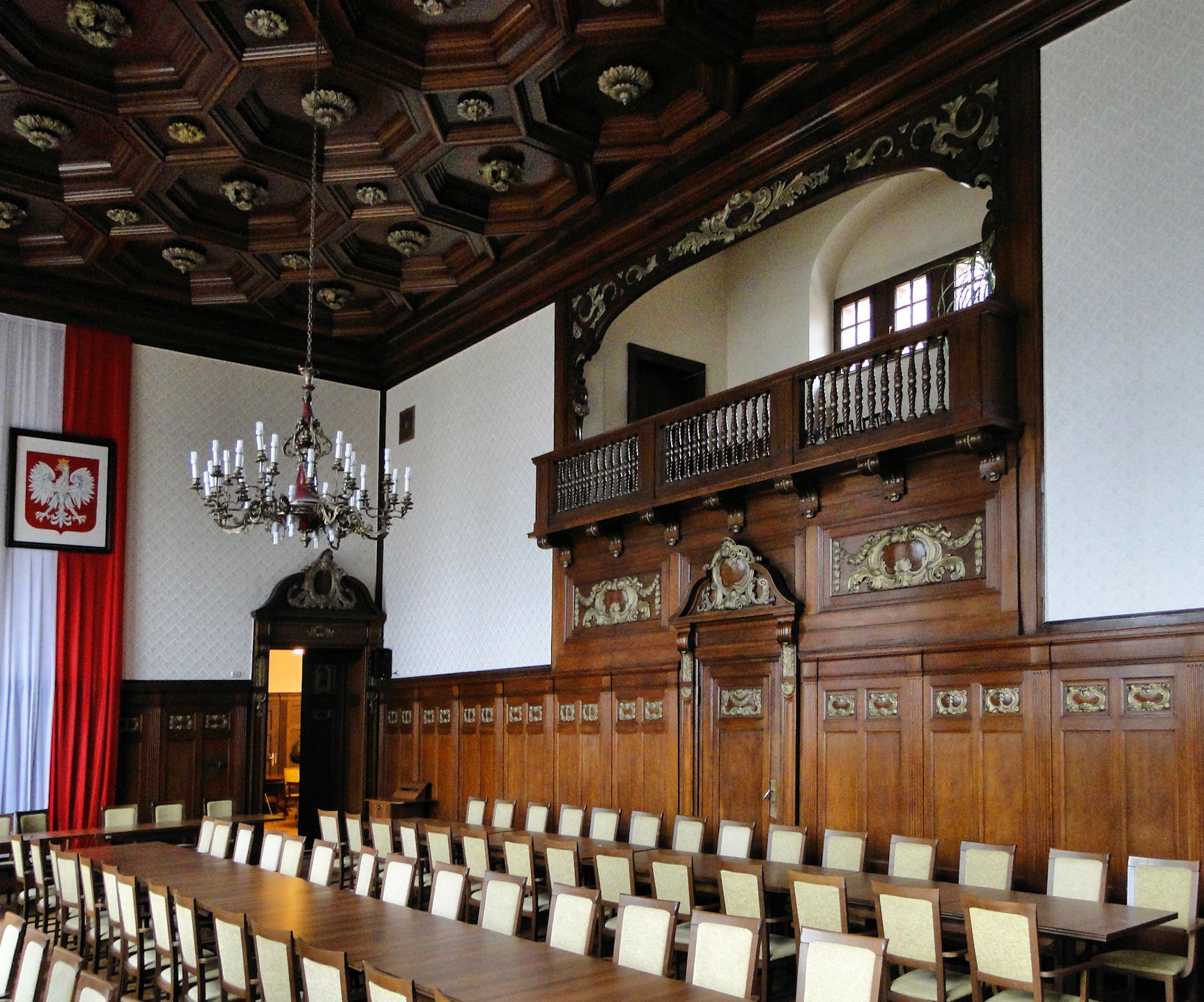
Conference Room

The main designer was Berlin architect Paul Kieschke. After his death in 1905, Paul Lehmgrübner continued the project and supervised the construction. Work began in 1906 on a 12860 m^{2} site, purchased for 392,000 marks. Because of the site's topography and the remnants of Fort Leopold, which had previously occupied the location, construction was preceded by large-scale earthworks. These included, among others, the construction of a moat bridge, the replacement of peat substrate, and drainage works. The building was built on the powerful, concrete foundations in places reaching 11 m below street level. The result of nearly six years of ongoing construction work was a monumental complex of three buildings connected by a common, richly decorated facade. The style belongs to German Historicism, emphasizing in particular parts of the northern Renaissance. The complex has two inner courtyards and two towers, one of which, 72 m in height, surmounted by a figure of Sailor. Many rooms in the building (notably, the main hall, stairway and conference room) have a representative character and retain their original decoration.

The building was completed in 1911. Its central part was taken by the Government Presidium (Regierungspräsidium) of the Stettin Region. The southern part was the regional president's official home. In the northern part of the office complex, offshore institutions such as Maritime Authority, Lloyd's Agency, Police and Port Authority of Hydraulic Engineering were located.

The investment cost amounted to 3.53327 million marks. The total area of buildings is 19451 m^{2}.

The building was not damaged during the bombings of Szczecin during World War II. After the war, it became the seat of the Polish municipal authorities under Piotr Zaremba, who on 30 April 1945 ordered the Polish flag to be raised on it.

In 1985, the building was inscribed in the register of monuments.

In 2011, on its 100th anniversary, the building was opened to the public. Visitors can follow underground routes — including an uncharted, flooded tunnel running toward the Oder River — and climb the towers, where a collection of gargoyles, assembled by the Germans for reasons that remain uncertain, is on display.

== Gallery ==
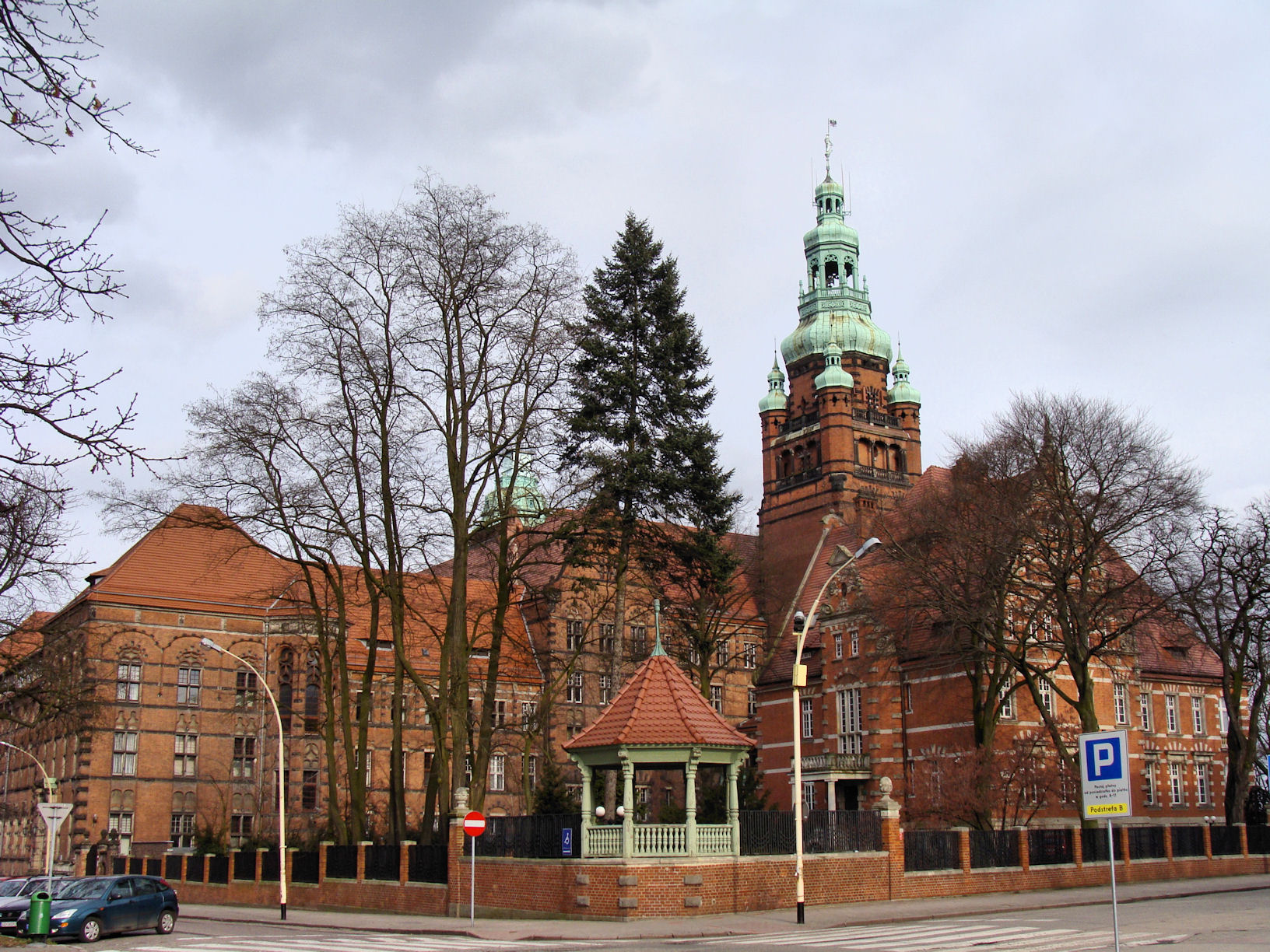
View from pl. Mickiewicz

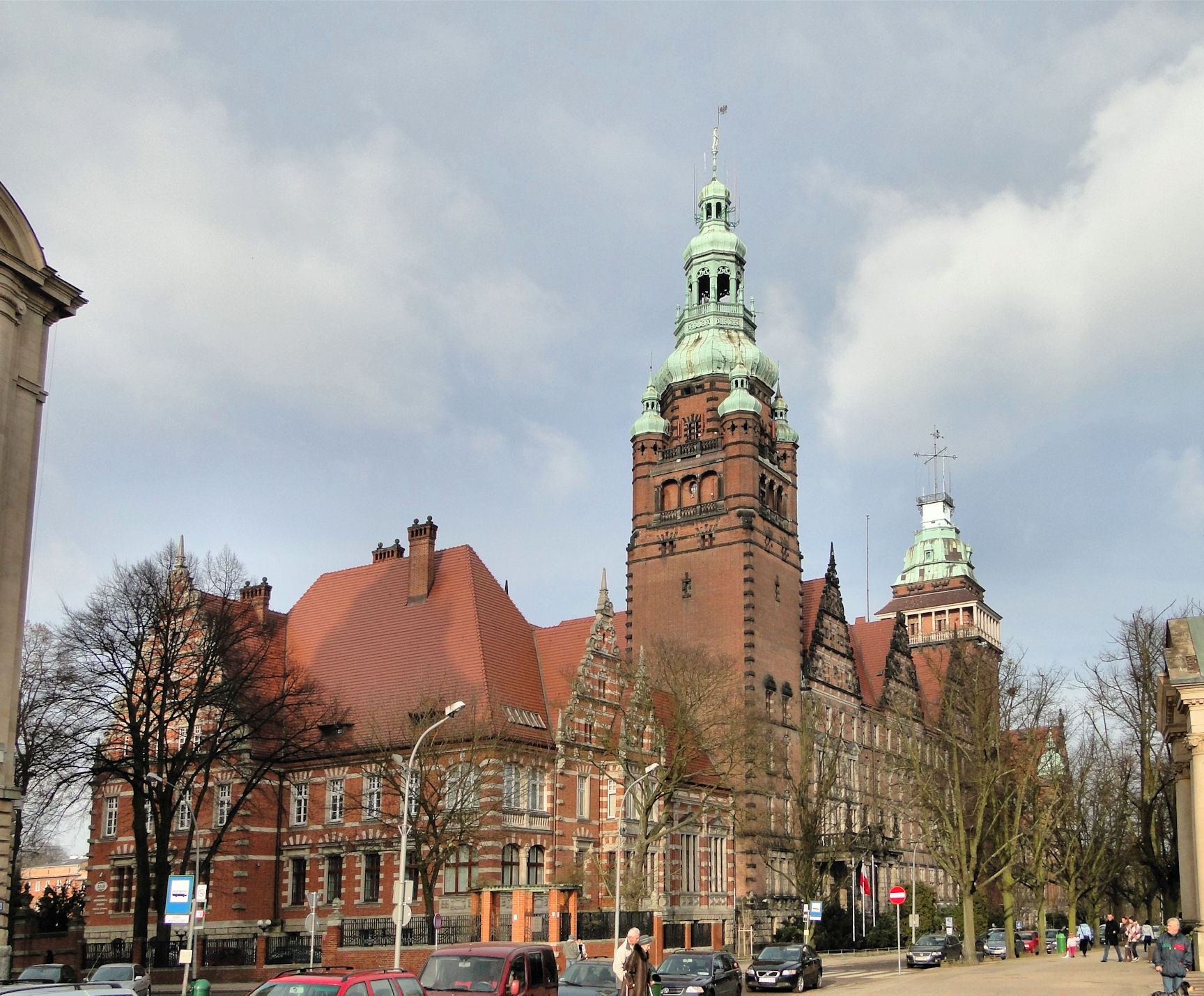
View from embankment

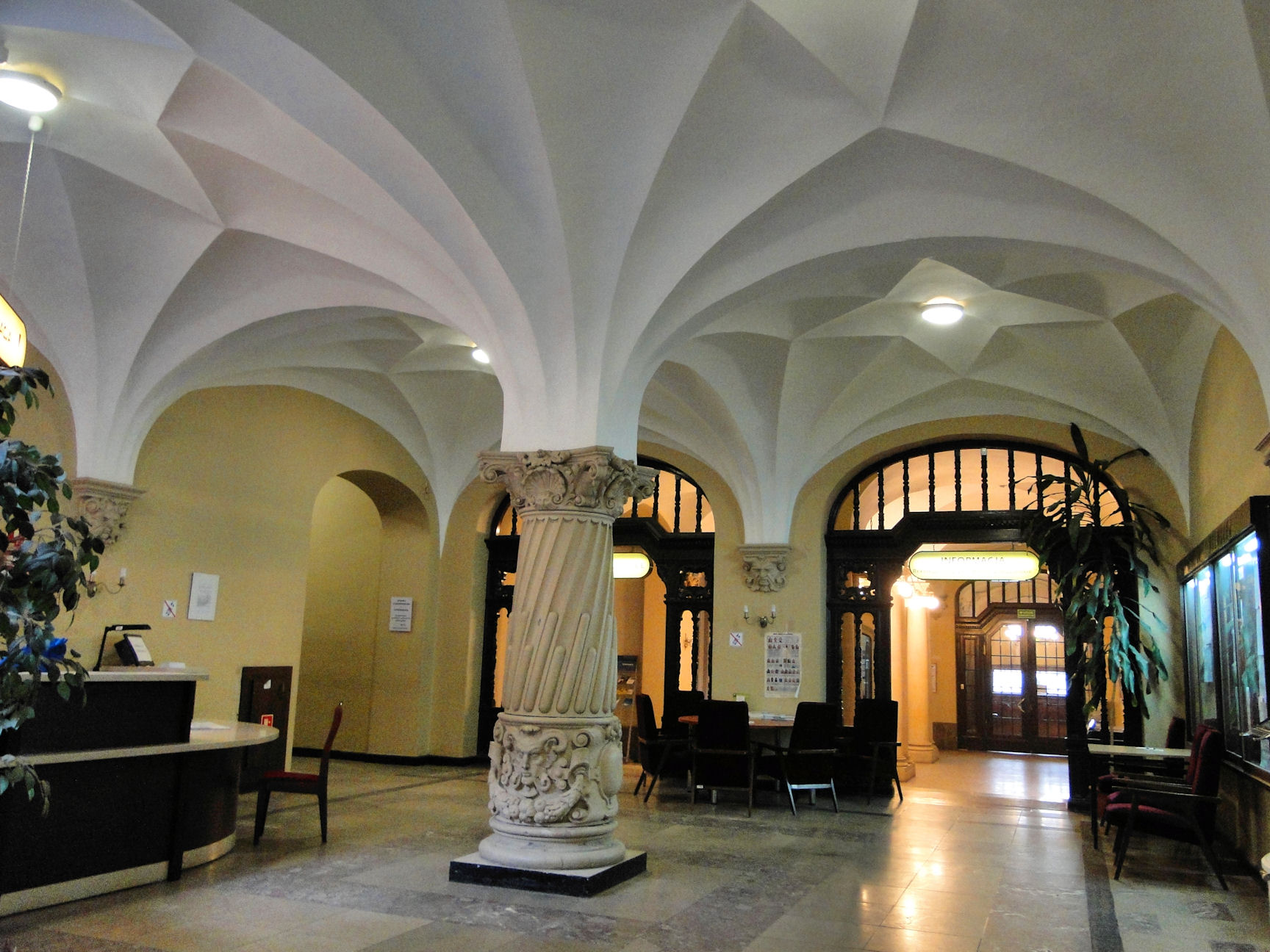
The Main Hall

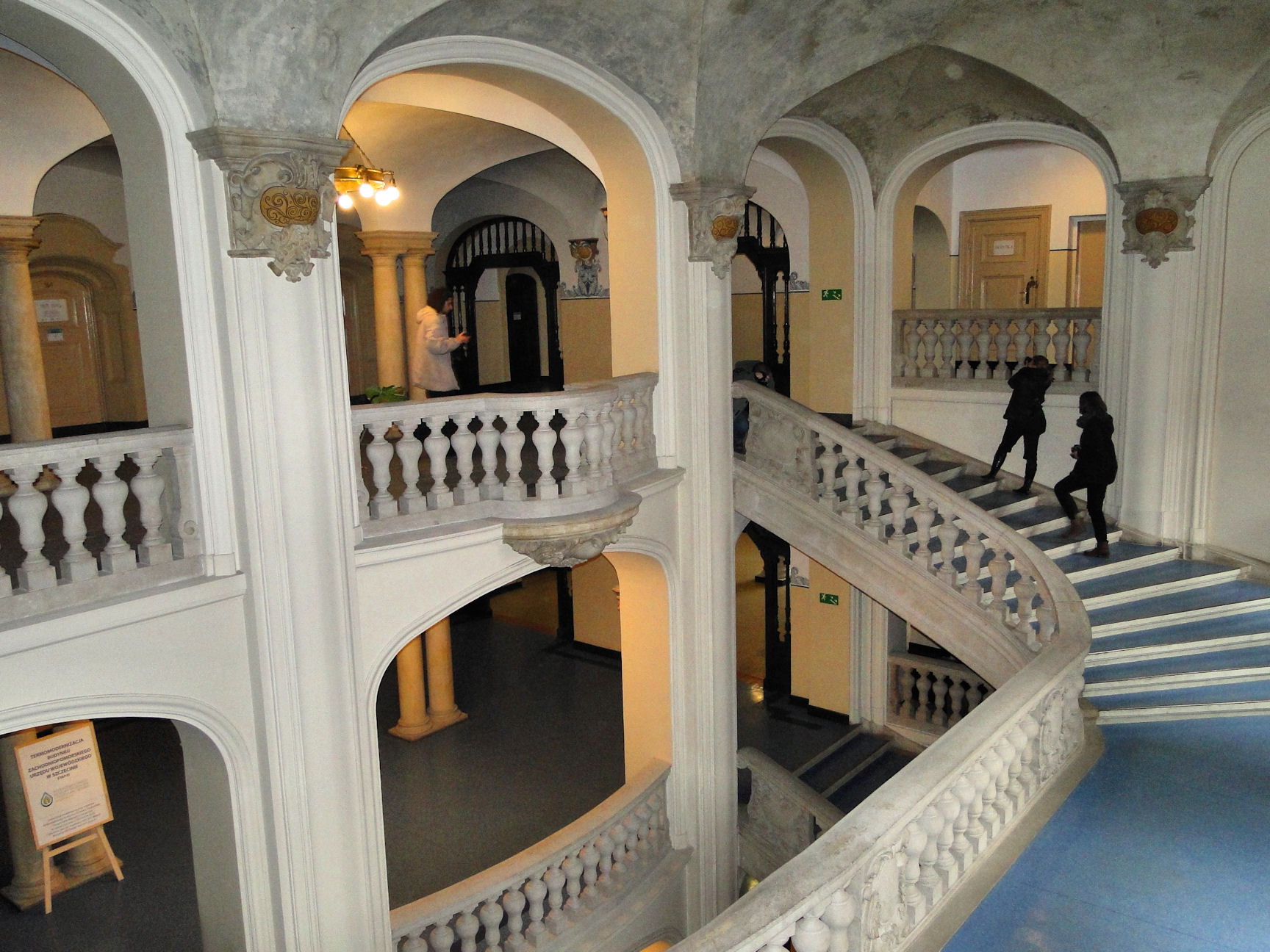
Staircase
