= Natalia Pacanowska-Haltrecht =

Polish art historian (1898 – 1989)

Natalia Pakanowska-Haltricht
- Born: 20 May 1898; Łódź, Poland
- Died: 8 June 1989 (aged 91); Warsaw
- Resting place: Northern Communal Cemetery
- Education: Jagiellonian University
- Occupation: Art historian

Natalia Pacanowska-Haltrecht, also known as Natalia Haltricht (born 20 May 1898 in Łódź – died 8 June 1989 in Warsaw) was a Polish art historian, linguist, and director of the National Museum in Szczecin (1952–1955).

== Life ==
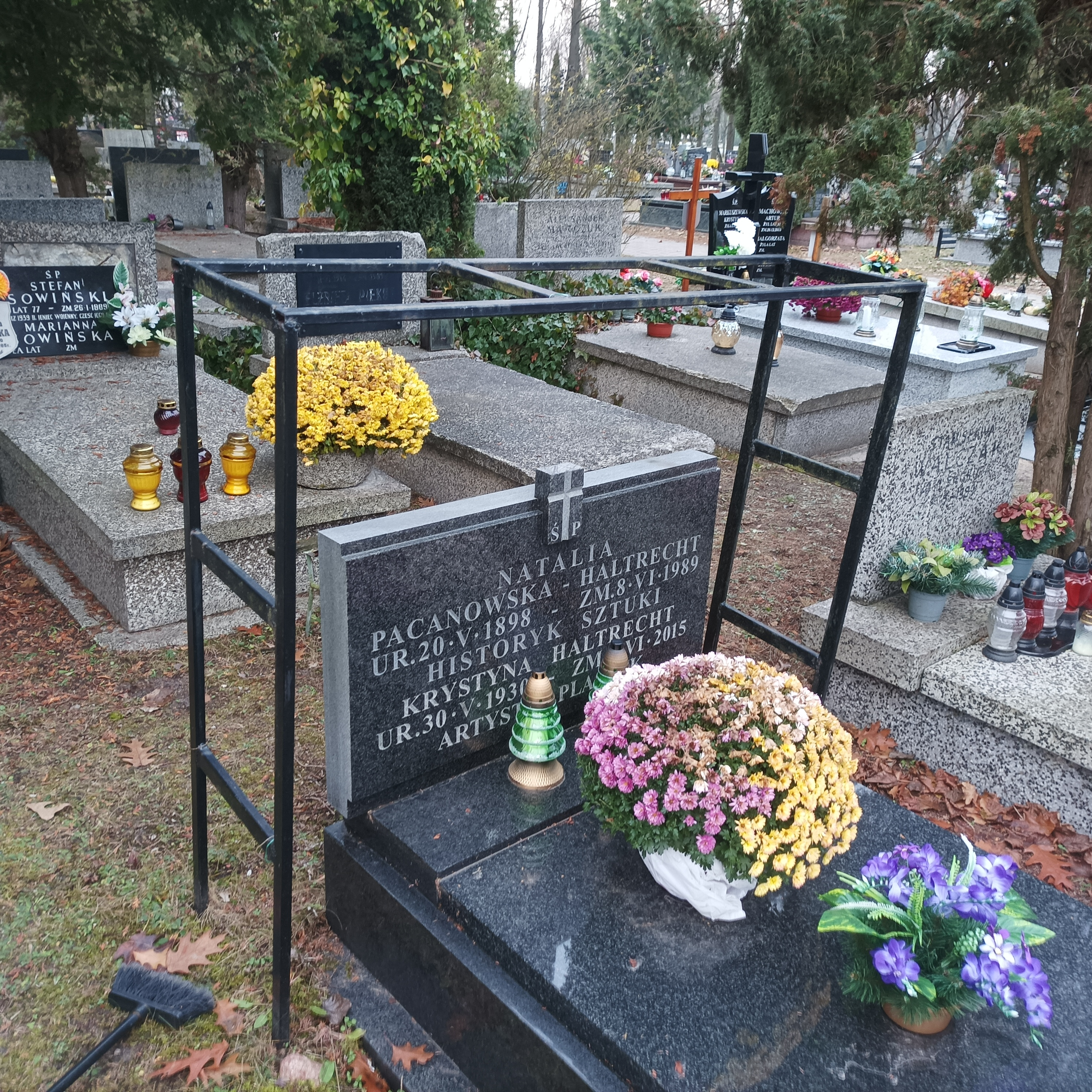
The grave of Natalia Pacanowska-Haltrecht at the Northern Municipal Cemetery in Warsaw

She was born in Łódź to an Orthodox Jewish family. She was the daughter of the merchant Paweł (Pinkus) Pakanowski and Helena (Handla), née Heiser. She had eight siblings, including Hilary Pakanowski, architect and painter; Bolesław (Benciun, Benjamin) Pakanowski, sculptor and set designer; Ewa Pakanowska, actress; and Rosa (Rachla) "Zola" Pakanowska, actress and communist activist. She married Józef Michal Haltrecht, a gynecologist from Łódź (d. 1941); they had a daughter, Krystyna.

== Career ==
She graduated from the Cecilia Waszczyńska Girls' Academy. In the 1919/1920 semester, she studied art history, classical archaeology, and Polish studies at the Faculty of Philosophy of the Jagiellonian University, and also attended the Kraków Theater School. After graduation, she worked as a teacher of rural children. During World War II, she taught secretly in Jędrzów. In 1942, due to a wave of arrests, she moved to Warsaw, then to Lviv, Nizówska, and Nadvirna, where she worked as an office worker in a phosphate mine. She joined the Home Army in Annopol and then the Polish Second Army. On 24 August 1944, she was sent to the Lublin region as a political and educational officer.

== After war ==
From 1947 to 1948, as a lieutenant, she served as the head of the propaganda department of the Provincial Committee of the Polish Workers' Party in Poznań. She was then transferred by the party authorities to Łódź, where she began working in the historical exhibition column (photomontage) of the Central School of the Polish Workers' Party. In 1949, she became the head of the cultural and educational department of the Regional Council of Trade Unions. She worked as a teacher of the Polish language in a workers' training center and as a lecturer of cultural, literary and artistic history at the State School of Volunteer Theater Instructors. In 1951, she became the curator of the Museum of Art, Łódź, where she simultaneously lectured at the State Higher School of Acting in Łódź, held courses for employees of the "Pinocchio" Theater in Łódź, and published articles in Głos Robotniczy.

In April 1952, she became curator and in May director of the National Museum in Szczecin . She organized several permanent exhibitions at the museum, including an exhibition of contemporary socialist realist art. She also published in the Szczecin press, participated in radio programs, and organized educational exhibitions. In September 1955, at his request, the Central Board for the Protection of Museums and Monuments terminated her contract. She moved to Warsaw, where she lived with her daughter.

== Death ==
Natalia Pacanowska-Haltrecht died on 8 June 1989 in Warsaw and was buried in the Northern Communal Cemetery (plot: E-IV-1, row: 1, grave: 18).

== Decorations ==
- Silver Cross of Merit (twice)
- Medal For the Victory over Germany in the Great Patriotic War 1941–1945
- Medal for Oder, Neisse and Baltic
- Medal of Victory and Freedom 1945
- Grunwald Badge
