= Bolesław I the Brave Embankment =

Observation deck in Szczecin, Poland

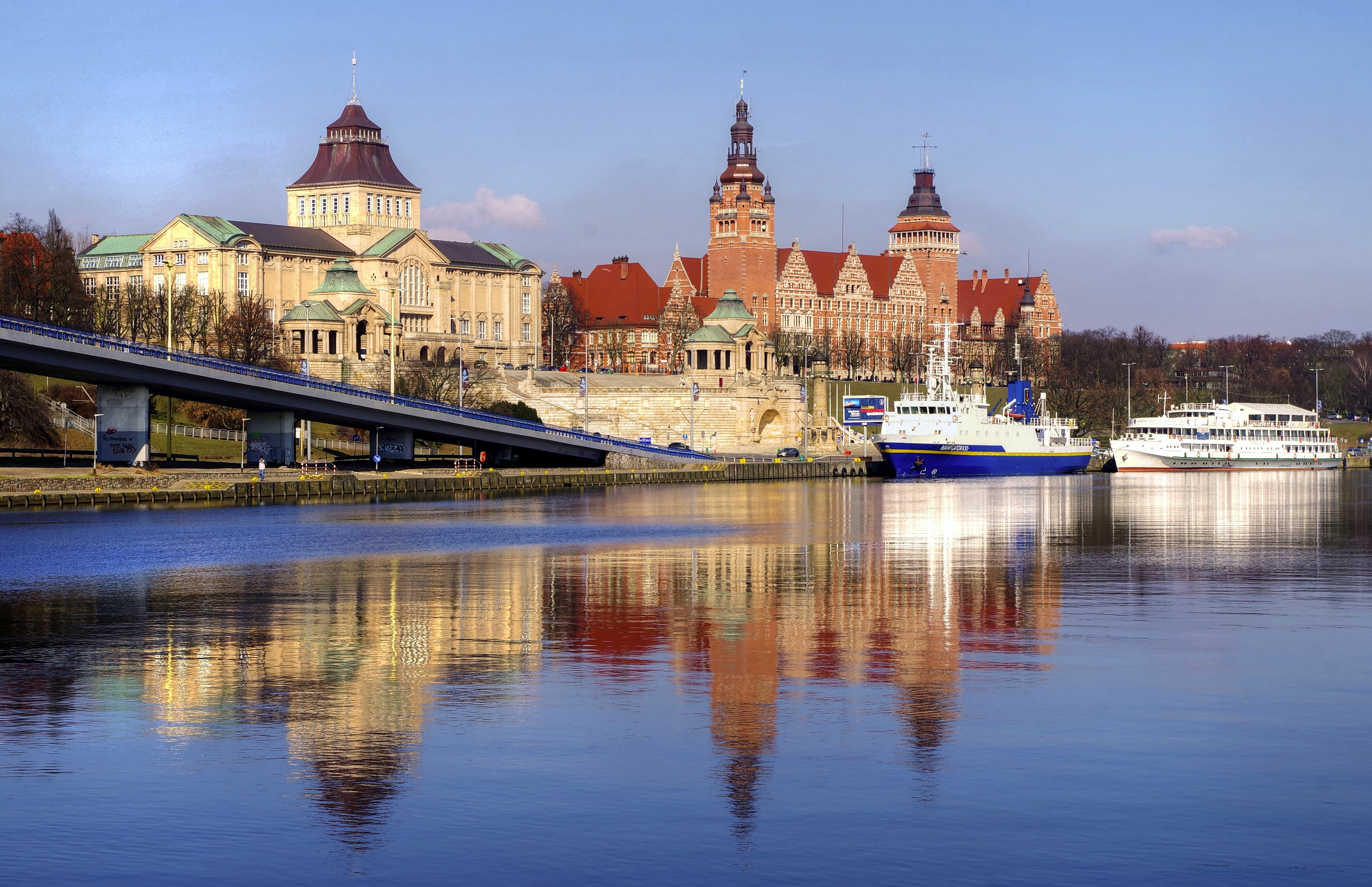
Bolesław I the Brave, Szczecin.

Bolesław I the Brave Embankment (Polish pronunciation: [bɔˈlɛ.swaf]; Polish: Wały Chrobrego), also known as Haken Terrace (German: Hakenterrasse; Polish: Taras Hakena, Tarasy Hakena), is an observation deck in Szczecin, Poland. Located on an escarpment along the Oder river, it is 500 metres (546.8 yards) long and, together with the National Museum, Ducal Castle, and Cathedral Basilica of St. James the Apostle, it forms an urban and architectural plan.

It was designed and constructed under the supervision of Wilhelm Meyer-Schwartau between 1902 and 1921. It was commissioned by the city mayor, Hermann Haken, after whom it was originally named following his death. After the city was transferred to Poland at the end of World War II, the observation deck was renamed after Bolesław I the Brave, a duke of the Duchy of Poland and later a king of the Kingdom of Poland, known in Polish as Bolesław Chrobry.

Like other monuments throughout Szczecin, the Hakenterasse was also polonized. The German inscription at the foot of the flight of steps ("Hakenterasse built 1907-1909") was plastered over. Originally, the names and emblems of 12 German port cities were inscribed. After 1945, the towns Swinemünde (Świnoujście), Kolberg (Kołobrzeg), Stolp (Słupsk), Danzig, Elbing (Elbląg), Königsberg (Kaliningrad), and Memel (Klaipėda) were no longer German cities and were retained on the monument, with only the names polonized. For the other seven German towns, Polish towns were chosen as replacements. Thus, Greifswald became Sopot, and Kiel became Łeba. However, the Polish names are usually shorter, so parts of the no longer needed lettering were plastered over, making this substitution still noticeable today.

== Bibliography ==
- Encyklopedia Szczecina, 2nd volume, University of Szczecin, 2000, pages 585–587. ISBN 83-7241-089-5. (in Polish)
- Szczecin – Łasztownia, N-33-90-C-a-4, Główny Geodeta Kraju, Warsaw, 2002, page 1, series: Mapa topograficzna Polski 1:10 000. ISBN 83-239-3275-1. (in Polish)
- NID: Register of immovable monuments. 2013 [access date: 2013-09-10].
