= National Museum in Szczecin =

- Muzeum Narodowe w Szczecinie
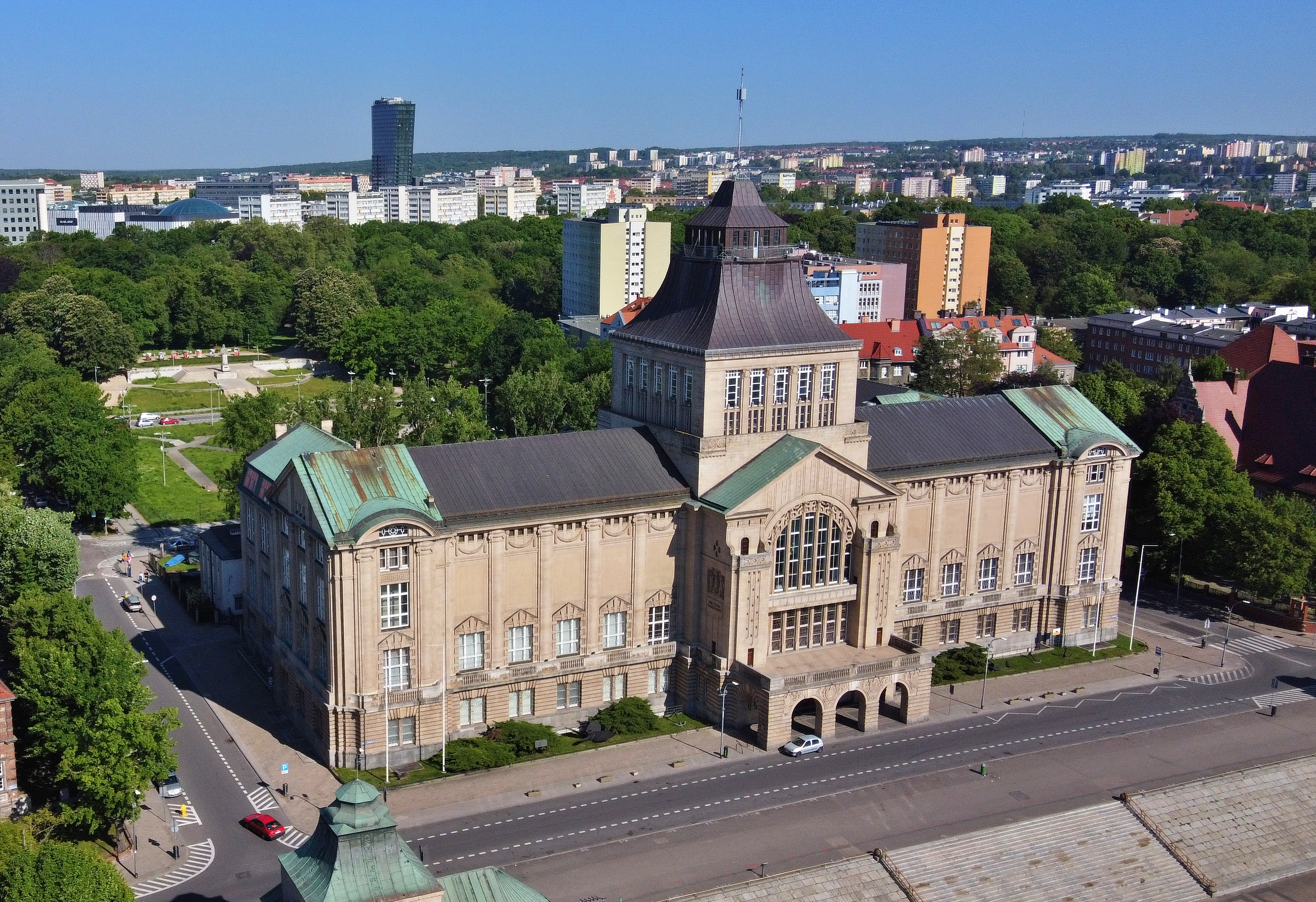
- Main building of the National Museum in Szczecin
- Established: 1945
- Location: Wały Chrobrego 3 Szczecin, Poland
- Coordinates: 53.43°N 14.5648°E
- Type: National museum
- Director: Lech Karwowski
- Curator: Dariusz Kacprzak
- Website: www.muzeum.szczecin.pl

The National Museum in Szczecin (Polish: Muzeum Narodowe w Szczecinie) is a national museum in Szczecin, Poland, established on 1 August 1945. The museum features ancient and modern art, archaeological, historical, numismatic, nautical and ethnographic collections and is divided into six branches, five located in Szczecin and one in Gryfice.

== Departments ==
The six branches are:

- Main Building of the Muzeum Narodowe w Szczecinie, Wały Chrobrego 3 – Maritime Museum
- Szczecin's History Museum, Old Town Hall, Księcia Mściwoja II 8
- Museum of Regional Traditions, Staromłyńska 27
- Museum of Contemporary Art, Palace of the Heads, Staromłyńska 1
- Dialogue Center "Breakthroughs" (Polish: Centrum Dialogu „Przełomy”), Solidarności 1 Square
- Narrow Gauge Railway Exhibition in Gryfice
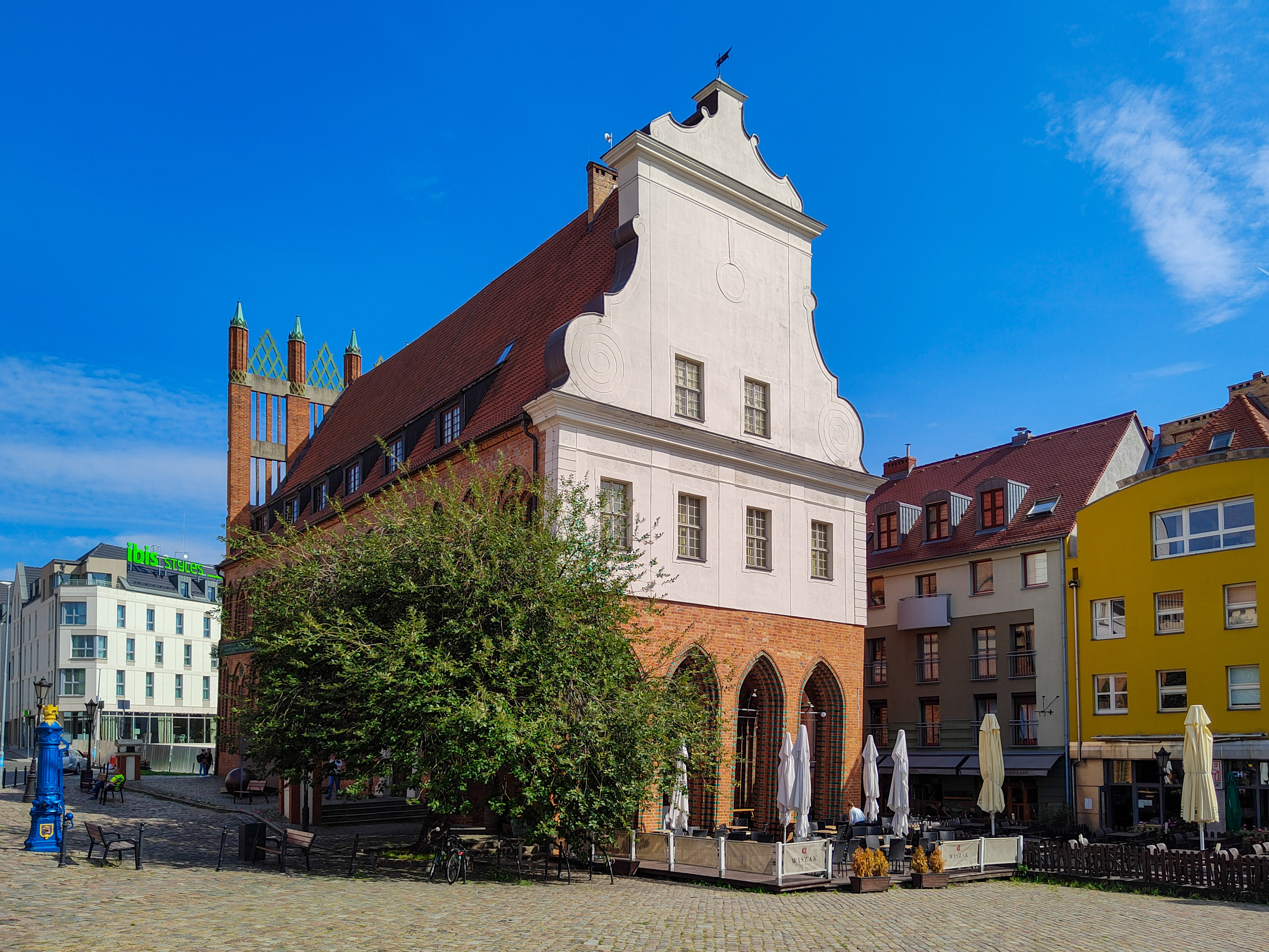
Szczecin's History Museum

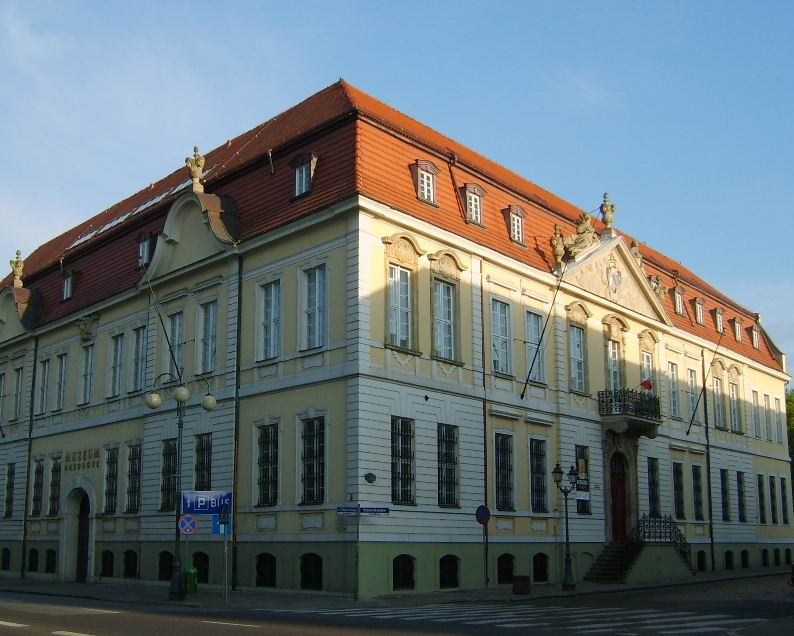
Museum of Regional Traditions

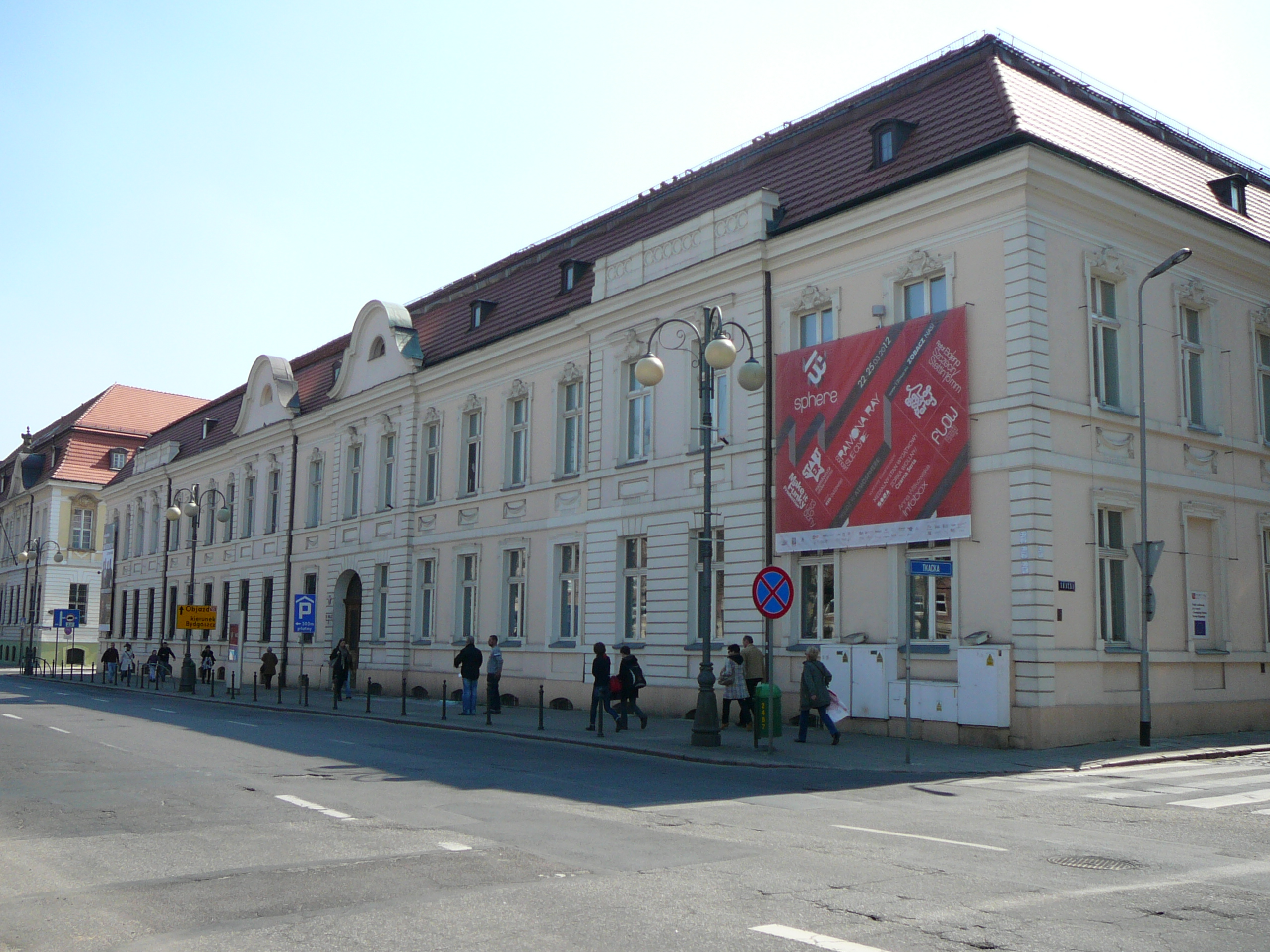
Museum of Contemporary Art

== Directors ==
- Lech Krzekotowski (1945–1949)
- Józef Marciniak (1949–1952)
- Natalia Pacanowska-Haltrecht (1952–1955)
- Władysław Filipowiak (1955–2000)
- Lech Karwowski (2001–present)

== Old Art Gallery collection ==
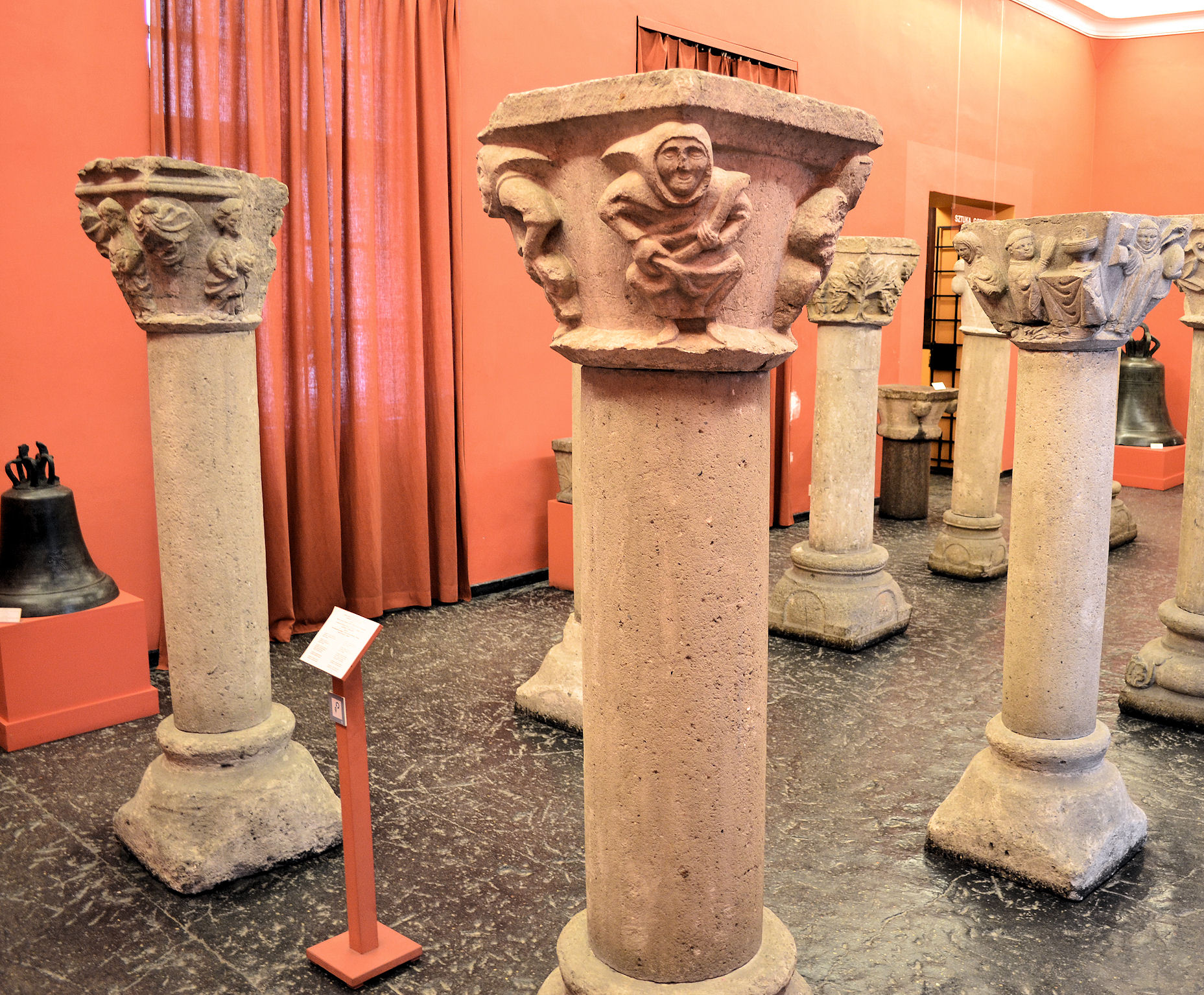
Columns from the Kołbacz Abbey

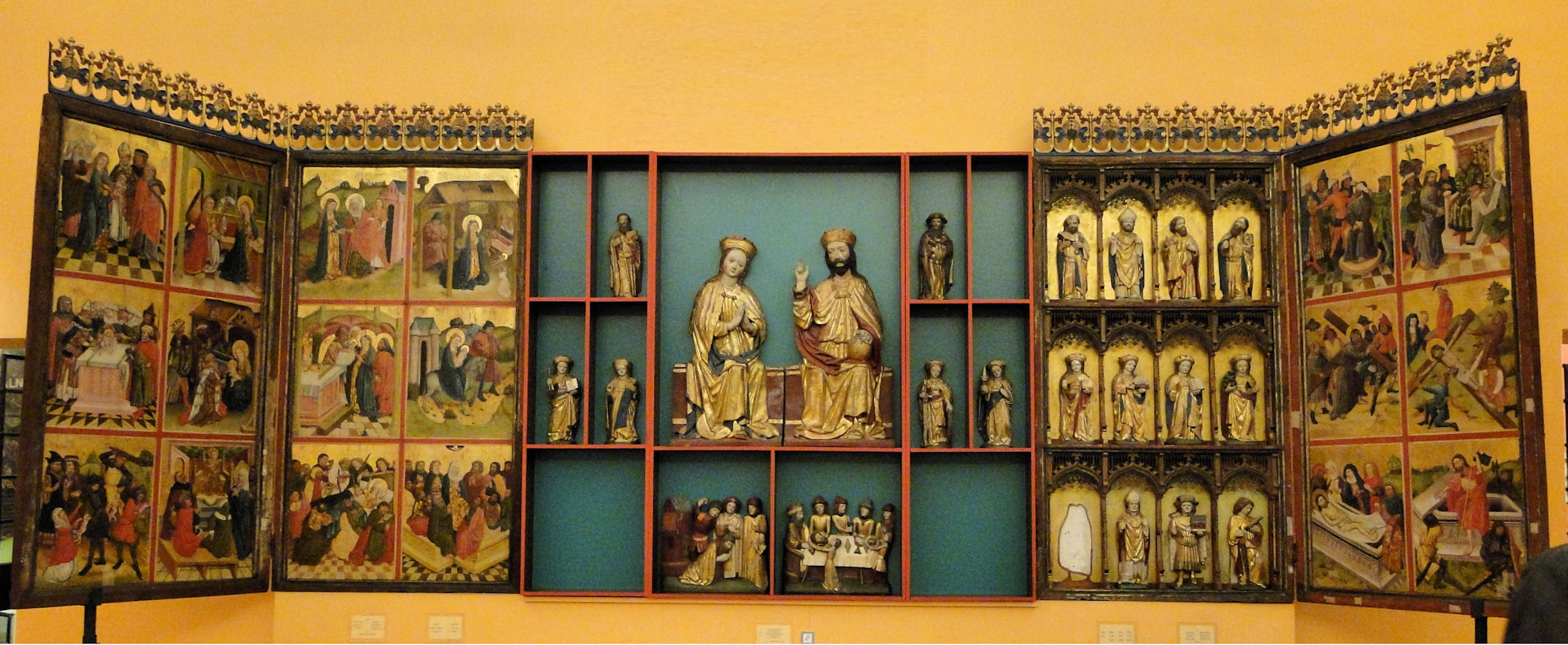
St. John's Polyptych

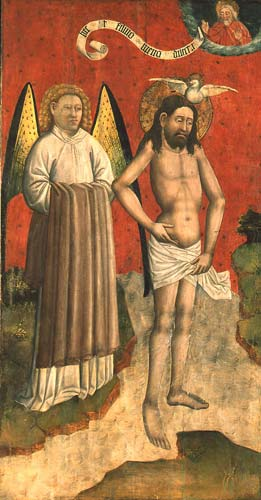
Part of the scene of baptism Christ in the Jordan (Quarter from the St. John's Polyptych)

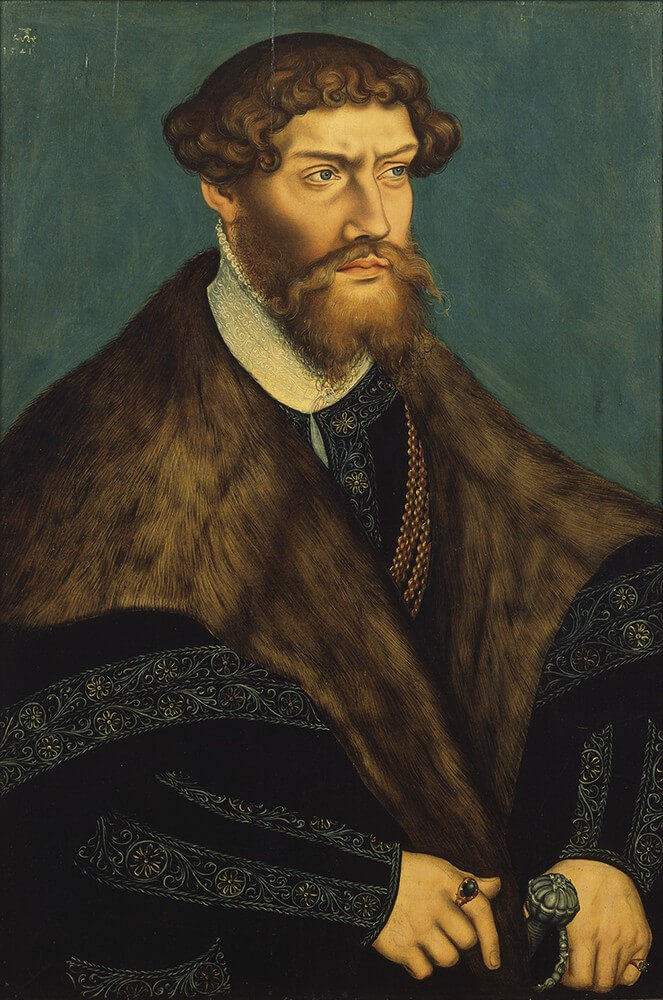
Portrait of Philip I, Duke of Pomerania, Lucas Cranach the Younger

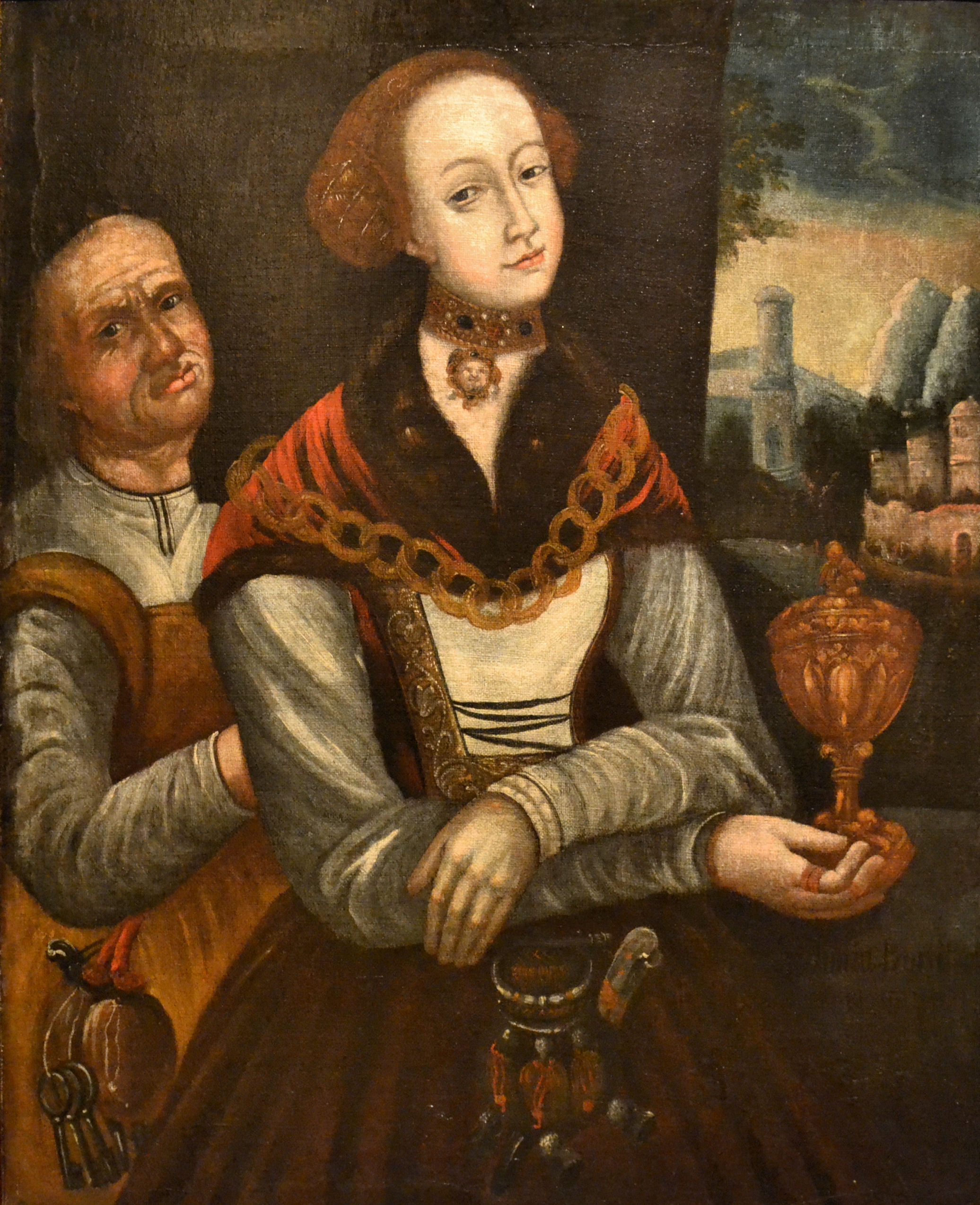
Sidonia von Borcke, by unknown artist

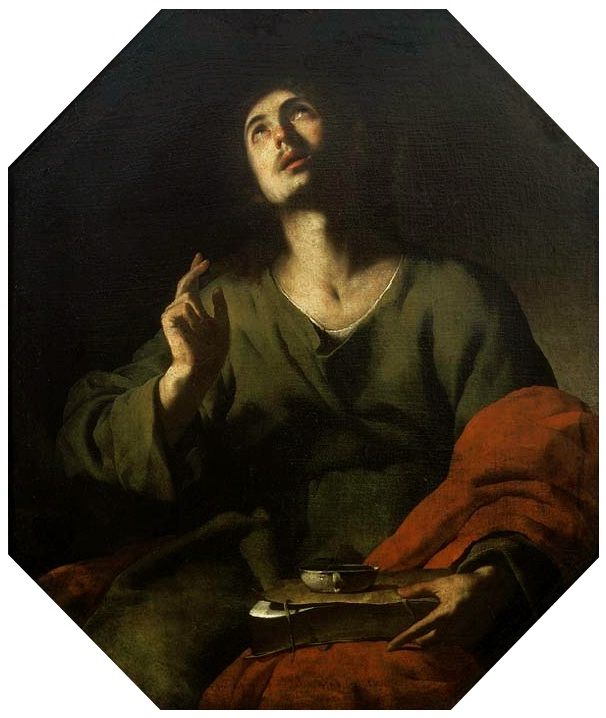
St. John the Evangelist, Bernardo Cavallino

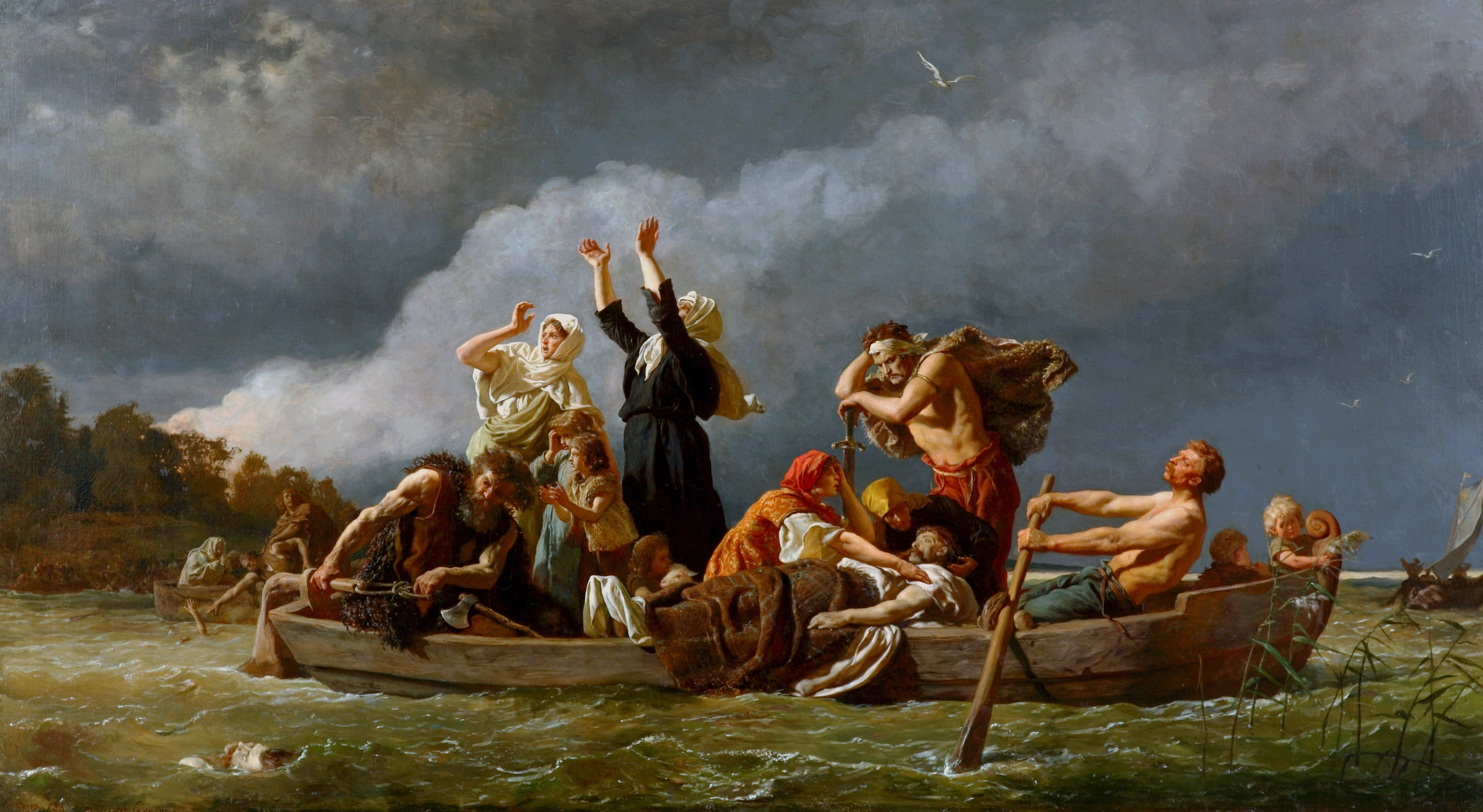
Without land, Wojciech Gerson

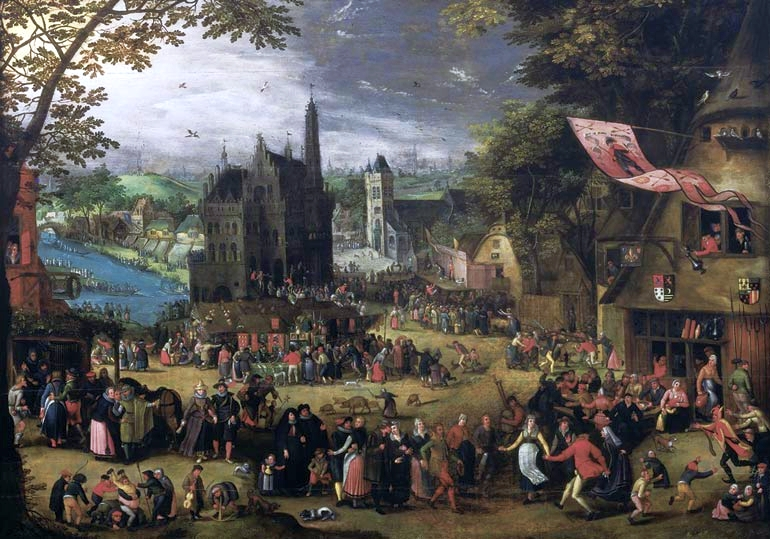
Grand kermess, David Vinckboons

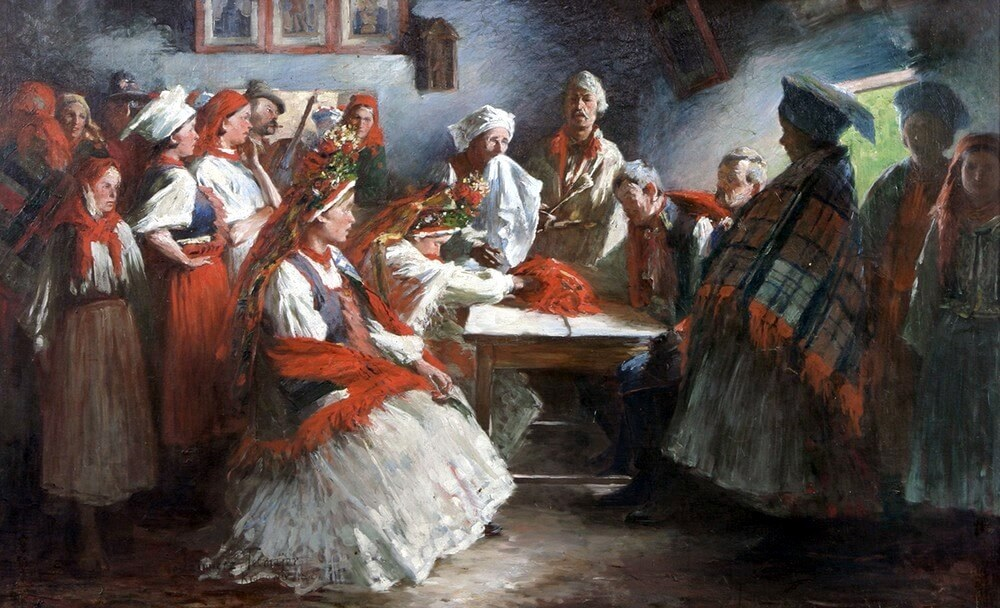
Zrękowiny, Włodzimierz Tetmajer

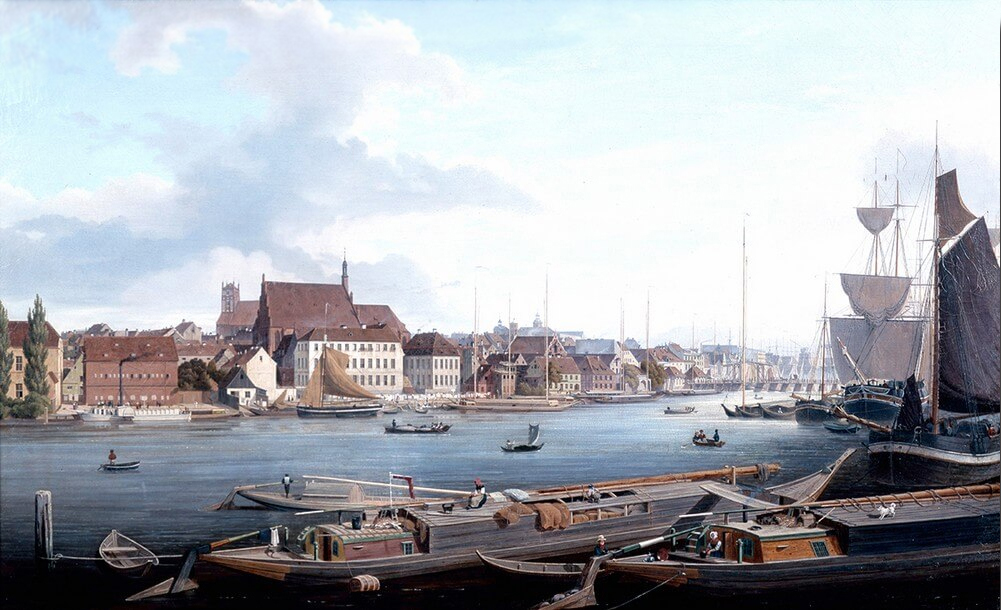
View of Szczecin, Ludwig Eduard Lütke

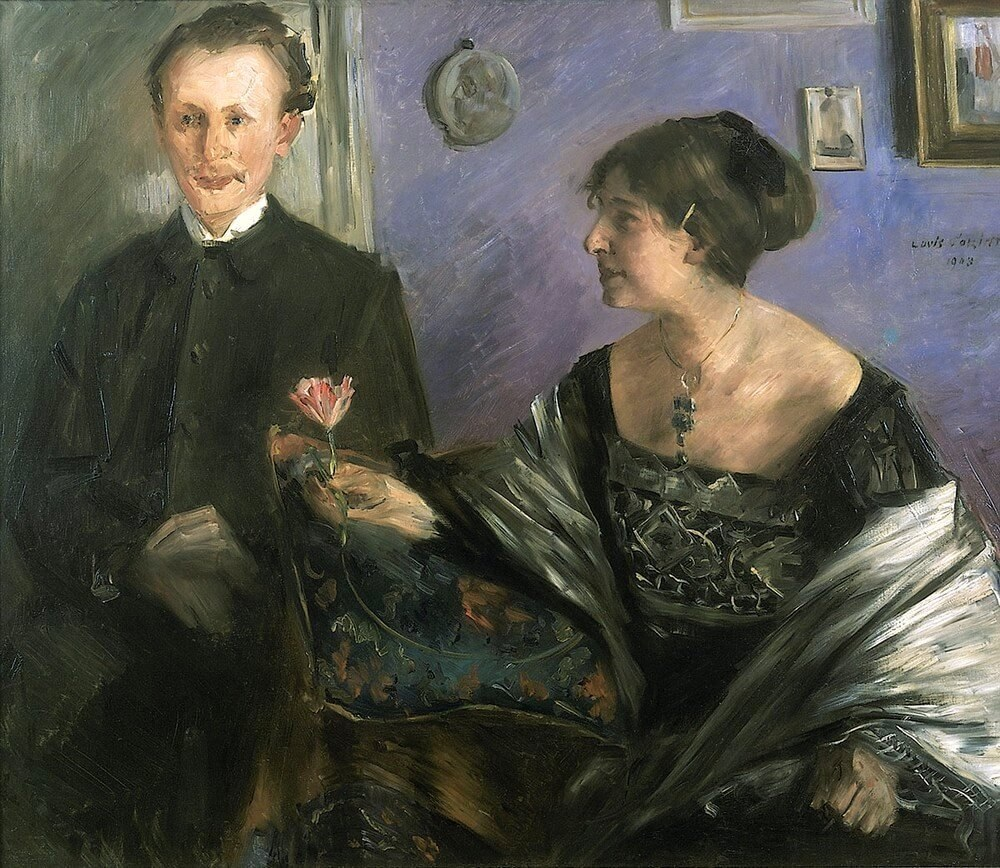
Portrait of the writer Georg Hirschfeld and his wife Ella, Lovis Corinth

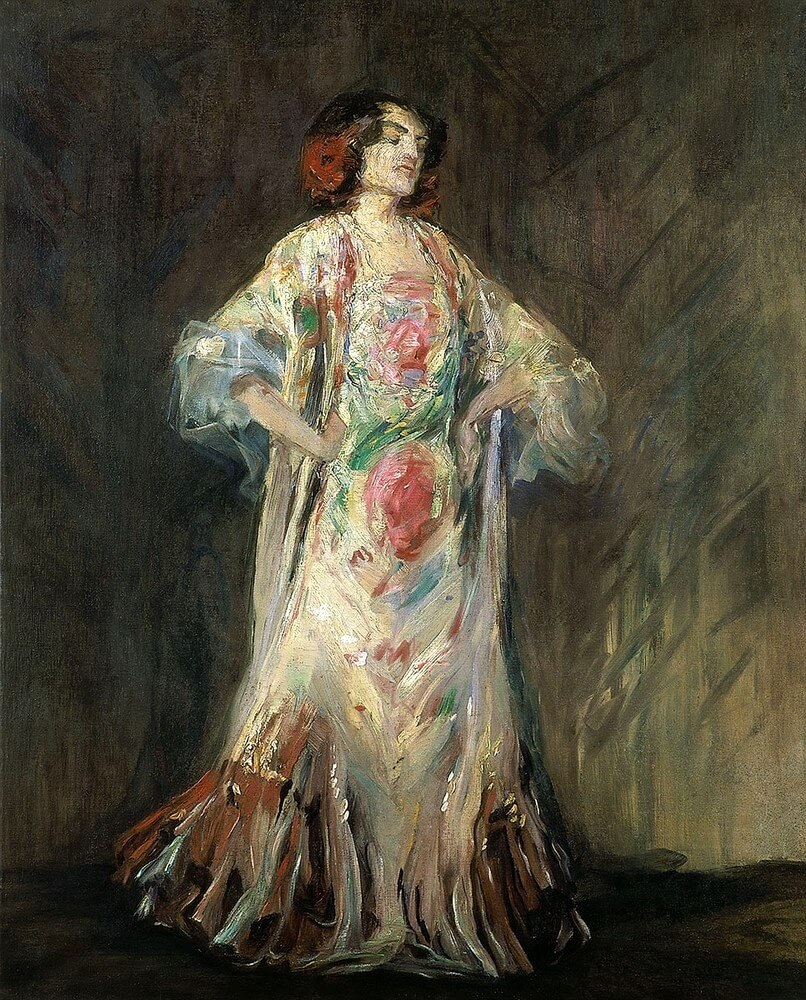
Portrait of a dancer Antonia Mercé called "La Argentina", Max Slevogt

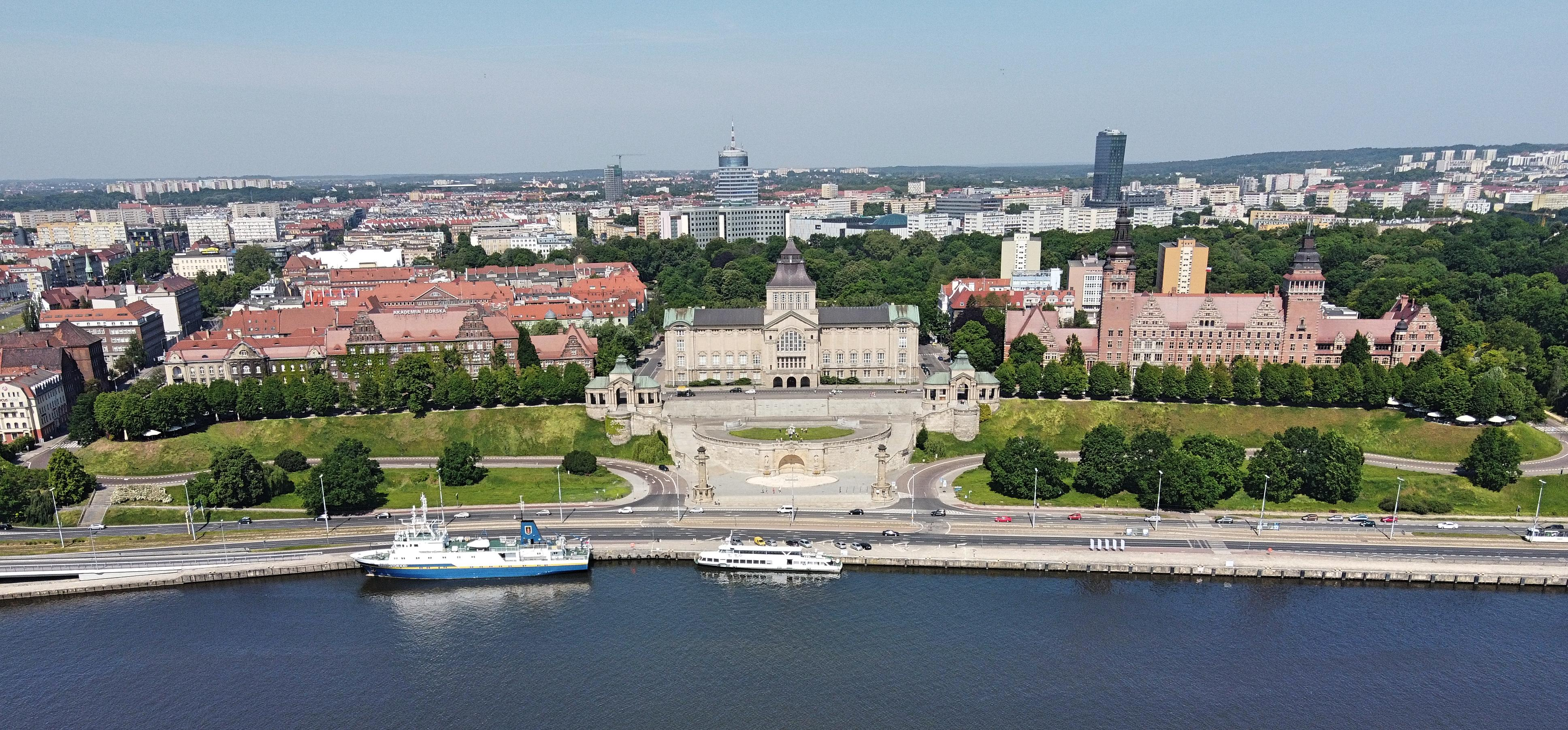
Panoramic view of the Szczecin National Museum

== See also ==
- List of museums in Poland
