= Old Jewish Cemetery =

Old Jewish Cemetery may refer to:

- Old Jewish Cemetery, Chernihiv
- Old Jewish cemetery, Cieszyn
- Old Jewish Cemetery, Cincinnati
- Old Jewish Cemetery, Česká Lípa
- Old Jewish Cemetery, Frankfurt
- Old Jewish Cemetery, Hanover
- Old Jewish cemetery, Hebron
- Old Jewish Cemetery, Prague
- Old Jewish Cemetery, Sarajevo
- Old Jewish Cemetery, Split
- Old Jewish Cemetery, Wrocław
- Remuh Cemetery, a cemetery in Kraków, Poland
- Israel Benevolent Society Cemetery, a cemetery in Chambersburg, Pennsylvania, United States
- Chatam Sofer Memorial, a cemetery in Bratislava, Slovakia
