= Česká Lípa =

Town in the Czech Republic

- Town
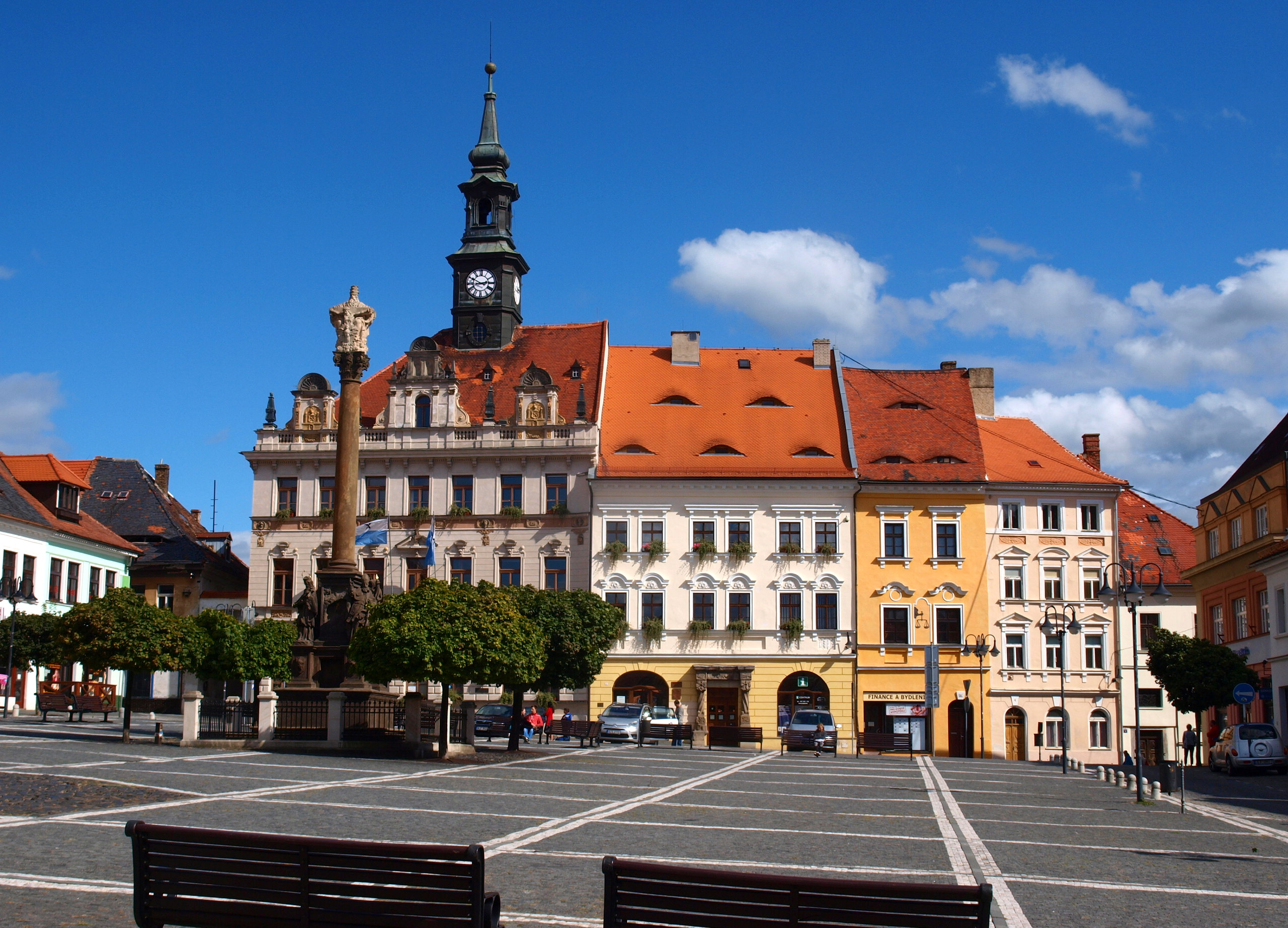
- Town hall and Holy Trinity Column on Náměstí T. G. Masaryka

- Flag Coat of arms

- Location in the Czech Republic
- Coordinates: 50°41′19″N 14°32′19″E
- Country: Czech Republic
- Region: Liberec
- District: Česká Lípa
- First mentioned: 1263

Government
  - Mayor: Jakub Mencl

Area
  - Total: 66.10 km^{2} (25.52 sq mi)
- Elevation: 258 m (846 ft)

Population (2026-01-01)
  - Total: 36,364
  - Density: 550.1/km^{2} (1,425/sq mi)
- Time zone: UTC+1 (CET)
  - Summer (DST): UTC+2 (CEST)
- Postal codes: 470 01, 470 06, 471 11
- Website: www.mucl.cz

Česká Lípa (Czech pronunciation: [ˈtʃɛskaː liːpa]; German: Böhmisch Leipa) is a town in the Liberec Region of the Czech Republic. It has about 36,000 inhabitants, making it the most populous Czech town without city status. It is an industrial town, known primarily for the production of parts for the automotive industry.

The historic town centre is well preserved and is protected as an urban monument zone. Among the main landmarks of Česká Lípa is the Lipý Castle.

== Administrative division ==
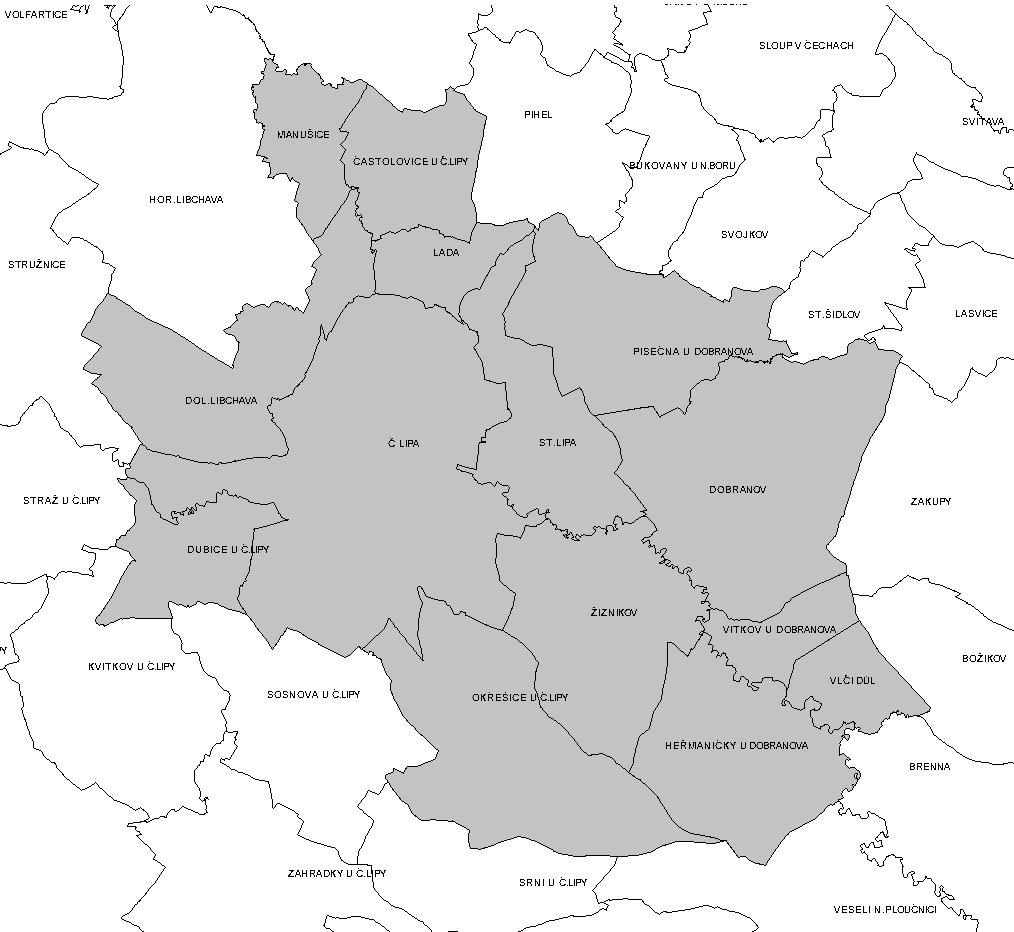
Česká Lípa division

Česká Lípa consists of 14 municipal parts (in brackets population according to the 2021 census):

- Česká Lípa (33,028)
- Častolovice (109)
- Dobranov (383)
- Dolní Libchava (551)
- Dubice (407)
- Heřmaničky (40)
- Lada (258)
- Manušice (90)
- Okřešice (68)
- Písečná (83)
- Stará Lípa (331)
- Vítkov (95)
- Vlčí Důl (28)
- Žizníkov (419)

== Etymology ==
The word Lípa means 'lime tree' in Czech. The settlement was probably founded near some old memorial lime tree. Later it was renamed Lipá (adjective from Lípa). After the German name Böhmisch Leipa ('Bohemian Lipá') appeared, the Czech name Česká Lípa was derived from it.

== Geography ==
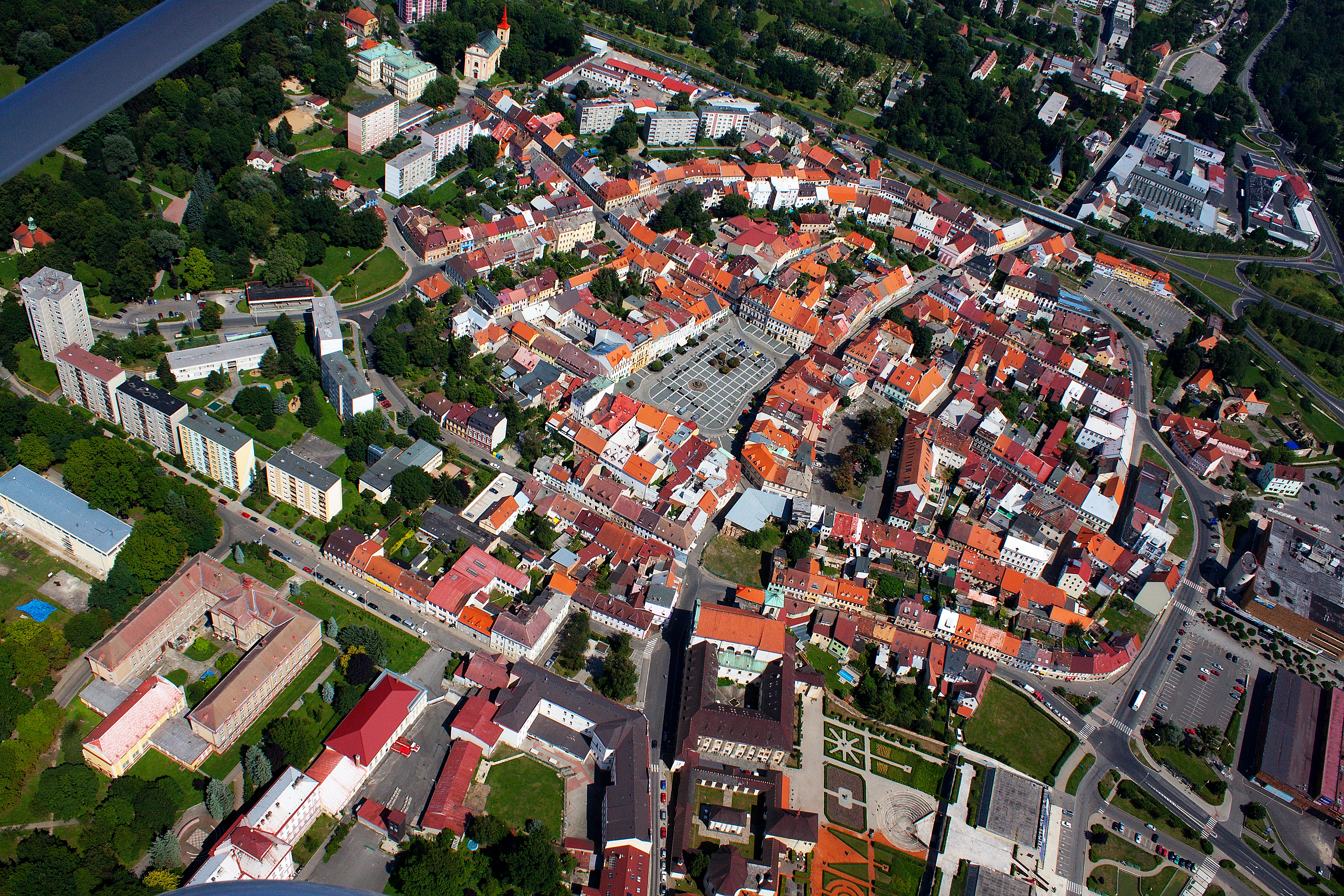
Aerial view of the town centre

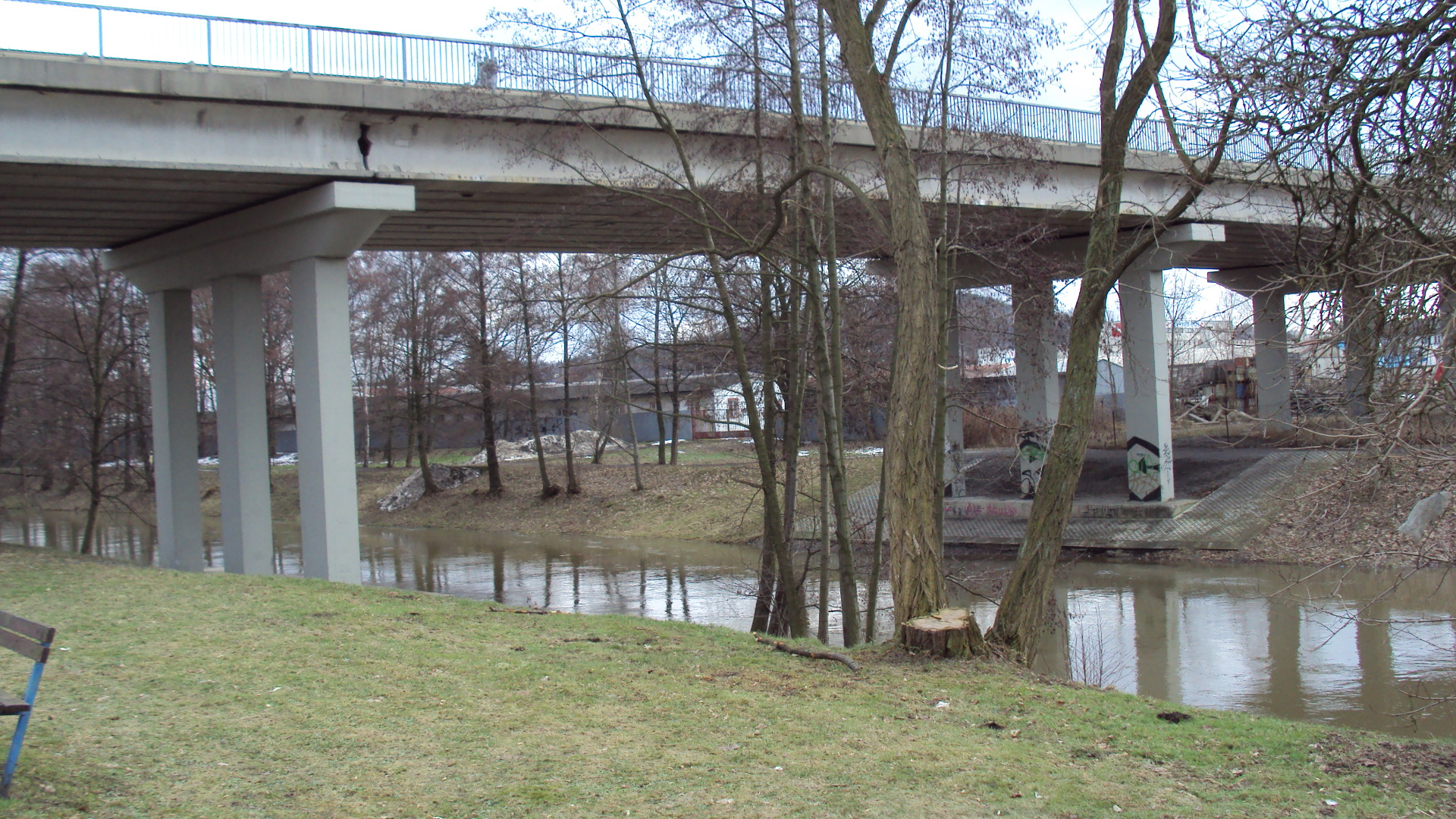
Viaduct above the Ploučnice River and the town

Česká Lípa is located about 38 kilometres (24 mi) west of Liberec and 67 km (42 mi) north of Prague. It lies in the Ralsko Uplands. The highest point is the Špičák hill with an altitude of 459 m (1,506 ft). The Ploučnice River flows through the town. The Svitavka River joins the Ploučnice near the village of Vlčí Důl. The southeastern part of the municipal territory extends into the Kokořínsko – Máchův kraj Protected Landscape Area.

== History ==
The first written mention of the settlement of Lipá is from 1263. It was originally a Slavic settlement on a trade route from Bohemia to Zittau. A town was founded on the site of the settlement probably between 1310 and 1319. The first written mention of the town is from 1337.

The history of the town is associated with Chval of Lipá of the Ronovci family, who founded Lipý Castle, and his son Henry of Lipá (1270–1329), a significant royal aristocrat.

Thus Lipý Castle became another fortified seat in North Bohemia on the contemporary trade routes. There was a Slavic colony near the castle, later renamed as Stará Lípa (now a neighbourhood of the town). There is a reference to Arnold, said to come from Stará Lípa, who was a citizen of Kravaře in 1263. Historians have deduced from the reference to Stará Lípa that Lipý Castle and accompanying settlement were established around that time.

Town walls were constructed at the beginning of the 14th century as well as the parish Church of Saints Paul and Peter, which was destroyed by a fire in 1787. In 1319, Henry of Lipá sold the castle with its surroundings to his cousin Hynek Berka. In 1327, Hynek Berka of the Ronovci family, was the lord of Lipá and its wider surroundings. When he died in 1348, his son Hynek took the title, and after his death his second son Henry succeeded him. His nephew Hynek Berka of Dubá then ruled the area. The oldest town charter, which he issued on 23 March 1381, states that discretions were granted to the town of Lipá and that it was he who contributed the most to the growth of the town and the castle bearing the same name. In the second half of the 14th century, the Veitmile family was significantly involved in the development of the town. Members of this family used to hold the positions of reeve and parson.

Development of the town was paused by the plague epidemic in 1389. At the end of the 14th century, the castle was controlled by other members of lords of Lipá family, including a powerful individual named Hynek Hlaváč who was often mentioned in historical accounts, until the beginning of the Hussite Wars, when in May 1426 it was conquered by Hussites led by Jan Roháč of Dubá. Between 1502 and 1553, a large part of the town and its surroundings belonged to the Wartenbergs. Later, the lords of Dubá / Lipá regained the castle and it remained in their possession for over 100 years. The first evidence of Jewish settlement in the town dates from 1529. The Jewish community began to grow in 1570. Albrecht von Wallenstein reunited the town in 1622–1623. He, and later the Kaunitzs, contributed to another boom in the town by founding a monastery and school. Large parts of the town were destroyed by fires in 1787 and 1820.

In the mid-19th century, the Jewish community reached its peak and formed 12% of the town's population. The community contributed significantly to the industrialisation of the town. Following the compromise of 1867, the town became part of Austria-Hungary until 1918, and seat of the Böhmisch Leipa district, one of the 94 Bezirkshauptmannschaften in Bohemia. In 1918, Česká Lípa became a part of independent Czechoslovakia. The town was ceded to Nazi Germany with the rest of the Sudetenland in October 1938 under the terms of the Munich Agreement and placed under the administration of the Regierungsbezirk Aussig of Reichsgau Sudetenland. Česká Lípa returned to Czechoslovak administration in May 1945 after the liberation of Czechoslovakia.

The modern urban development of the town was influenced by industrial production and uranium mining in the region. Residential neighbourhoods consisting of large amounts of prefabricated housing were built on the outskirts, while the town centre was preserved and declared as an urban monument zone.

== Demographics ==
Historical population

Year	Pop.	±%
1869	12,582	—
1880	13,368	+6.2%
1890	13,369	+0.0%
1900	13,712	+2.6%
1910	15,579	+13.6%

Year	Pop.	±%
1921	15,335	−1.6%
1930	18,174	+18.5%
1950	14,932	−17.8%
1961	15,864	+6.2%
1970	17,658	+11.3%

Year	Pop.	±%
1980	24,862	+40.8%
1991	39,463	+58.7%
2001	39,358	−0.3%
2011	36,017	−8.5%
2021	35,890	−0.4%

Source: Censuses

== Economy ==
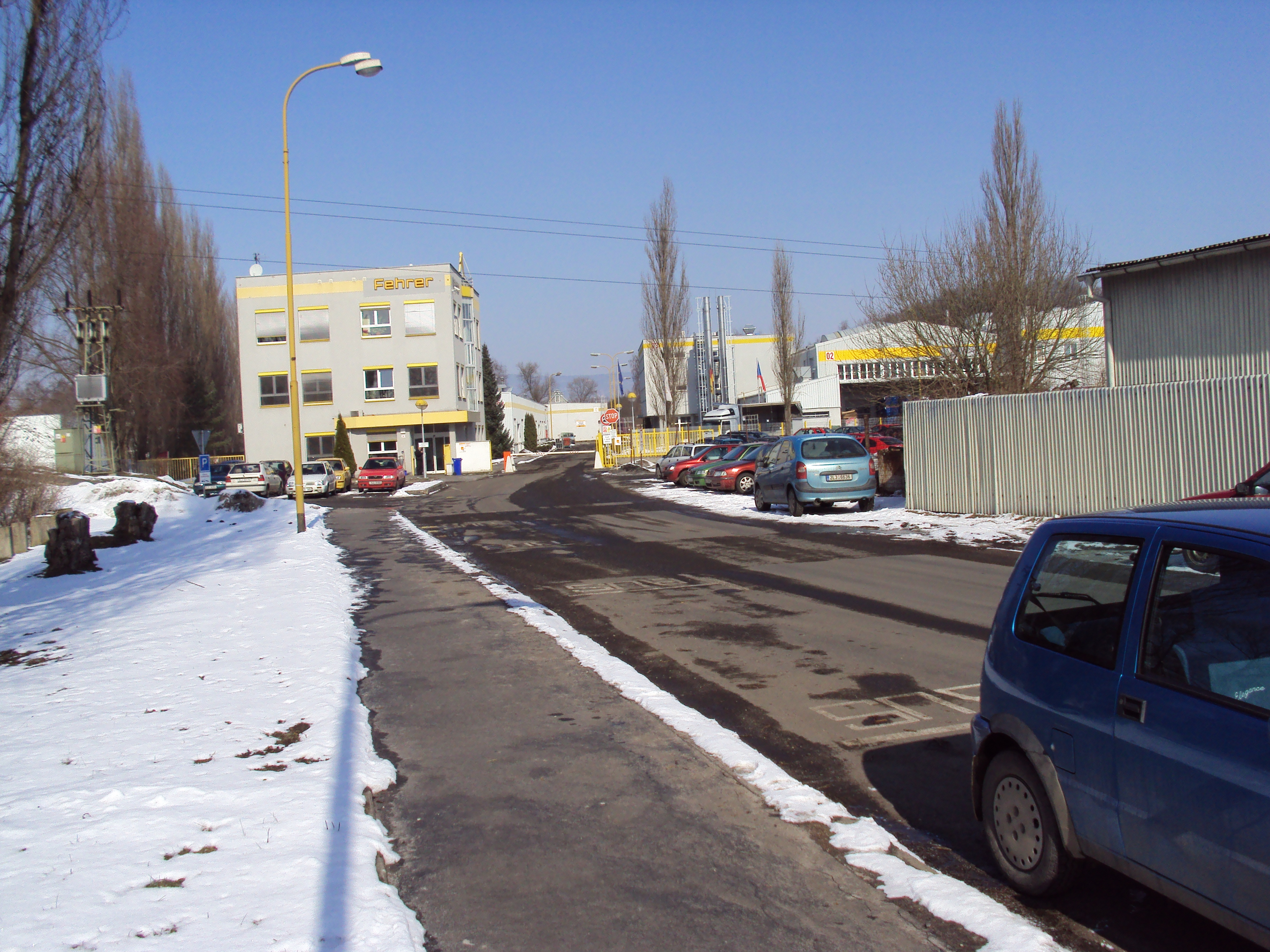
Fehrer Bohemia company in the industrial zone

There are several large industrial companies based in Česká Lípa, especially producers of automotive parts. The town's industry is concentrated in the Dubice industry zone, which has an area of 200 ha (490 acres). The major companies based in the industrial zone include Adient Czech Republic, Fehrer Bohemia and Bombardier Inc. The largest employer is the Adient Czech Republic company, which has its development centre and one of factories in Česká Lípa. The factory, which focuses on sewing car seat covers, was founded in 1992 and employs about 600 people.

The hospital is the largest non-industrial employer.

== Transport ==
=== Rail ===
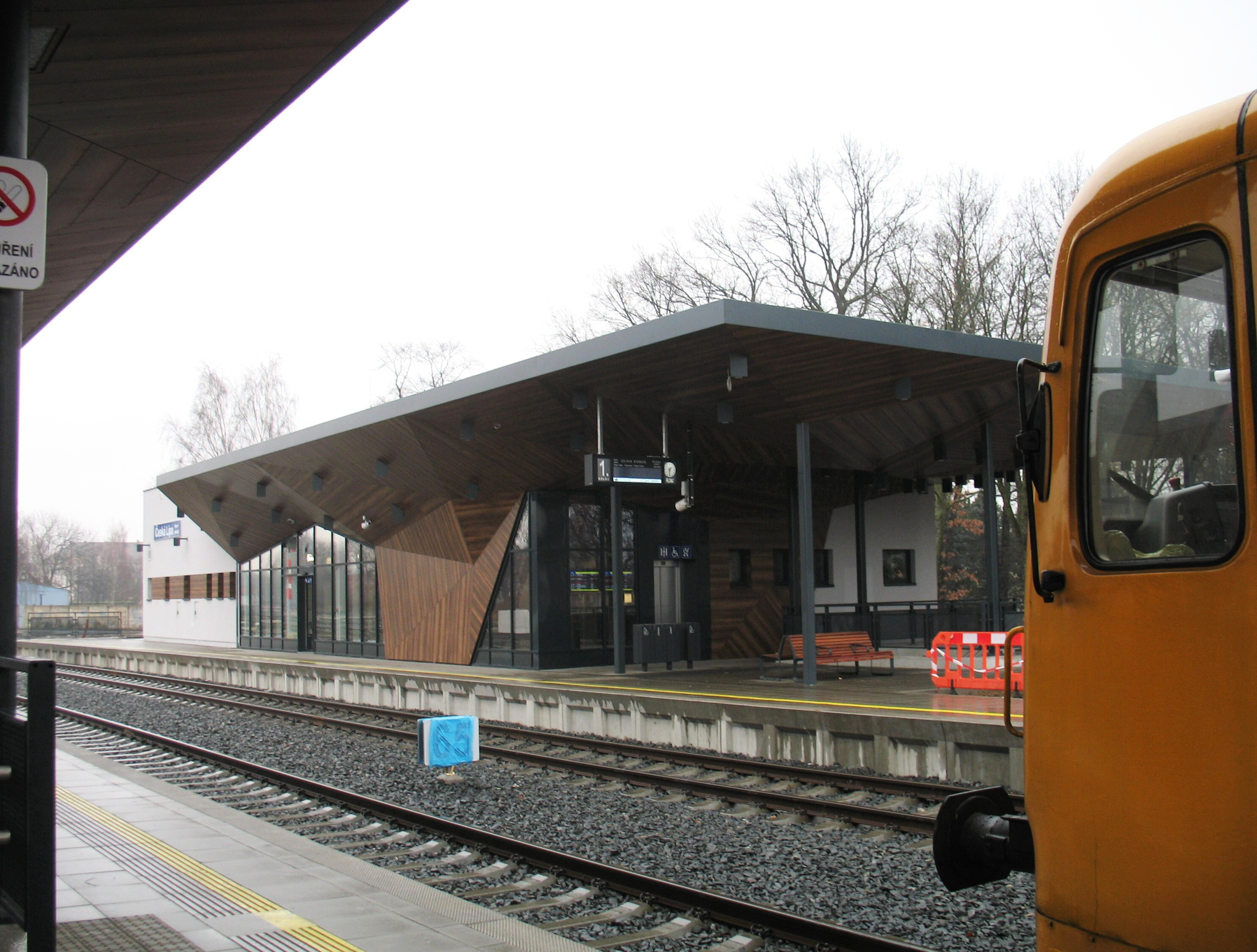
Main railway station

Česká Lípa hlavní nádraží (main railway station) is a junction of the Liberec–Děčín, Kolín–Rumburk and Česká Lípa–Louny lines. Three smaller train stops, Česká Lípa-Střelnice, Česká Lípa-Holý vrch and Vlčí důl-Dobranov are located in the suburbs of the town.

=== Bus transport ===
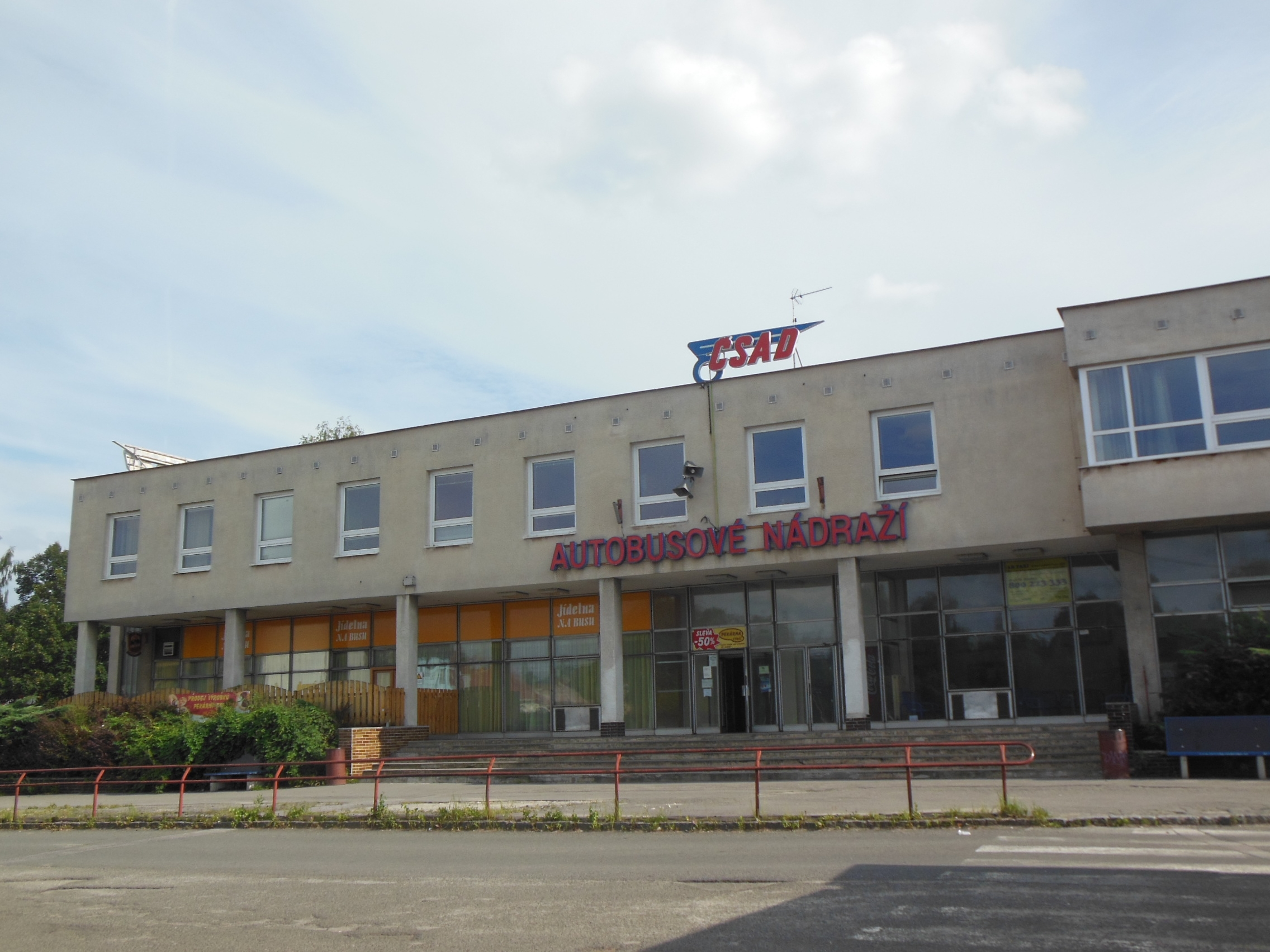
Bus station hall

Regional and intercity transportation is mainly operated by ČSAD Česká Lípa, based at the town bus station from 1986, and provides connections to Mimoň, Nový Bor and Prague, as well as surrounding villages.

Small transport companies provide transport for commuters to large local companies, or offer alternative transport for Czech Railways in case of lockouts etc. Nevertheless, the municipal transit company BusLine a.s. has taken over most such services. BusLine a.s. is the only transit carrier in Česká Lípa. The municipal transit runs exclusively within the town while further parts of the county are covered by regional bus services.

Česká Lípa municipal transit has been a member of the IDOL regional integrated transport network since July 2009. IDOL is based on the integrated tariff and the OpusCard contactless smartcard as a uniform fare carrier.

=== Road ===
The town's main road transport connection is the straight I/9 road, which connects Prague with the Czech–German border via Česká Lípa. From west to east there is also the II/262 road from Děčín to Zákupy.

== Education ==
The Česká Lípa Primary Art School was established in 1927. Since 1990, it has been located in a building called Bílý dům ("White House"), which had housed the Communist Party District Committee until then. The large hall on the ground floor is the home of the DUHA Dancing School, and the facility is also used for exhibitions and by other external music groups.

== Culture ==
=== Buildings ===
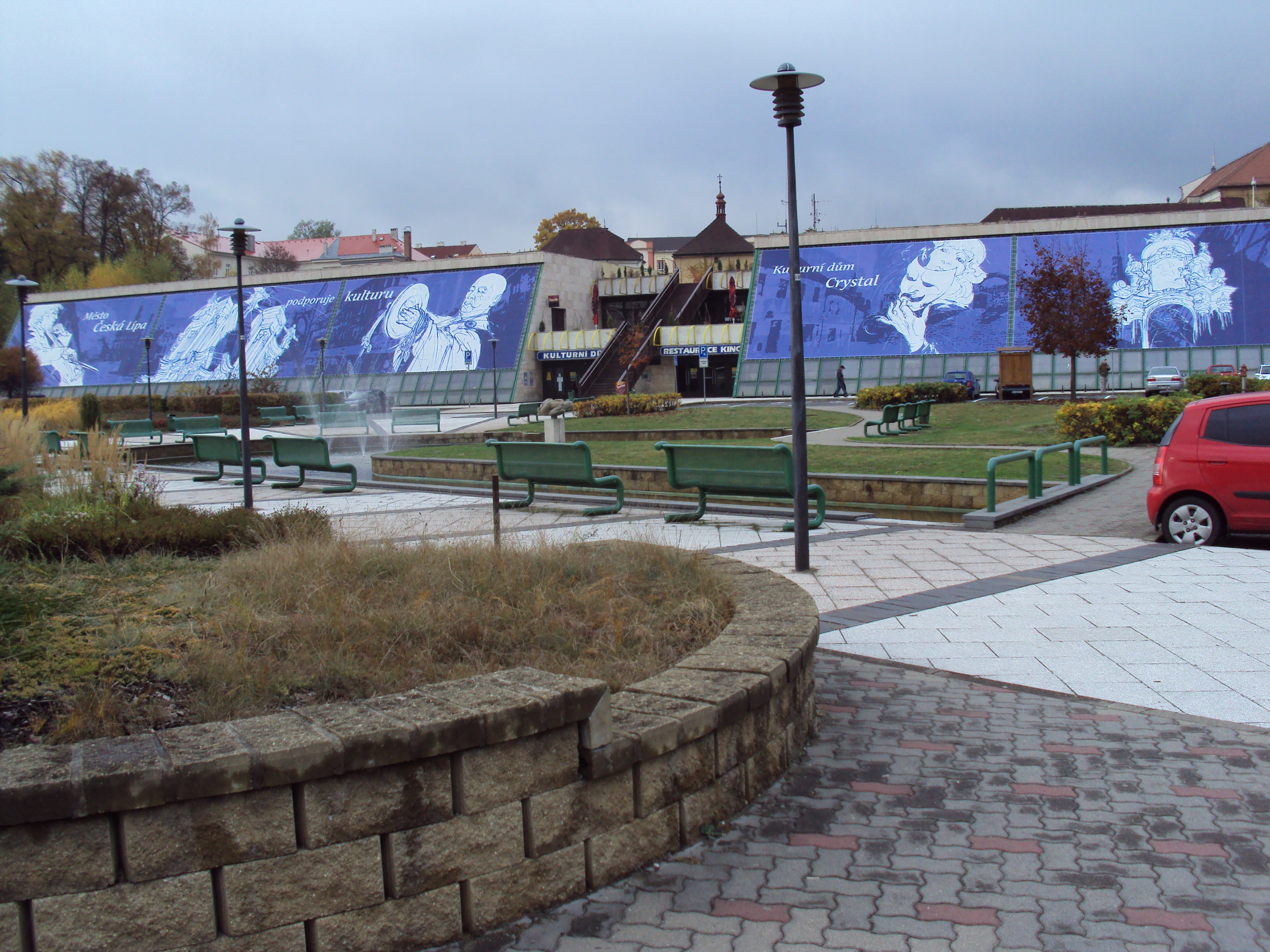
Crystal House of Culture

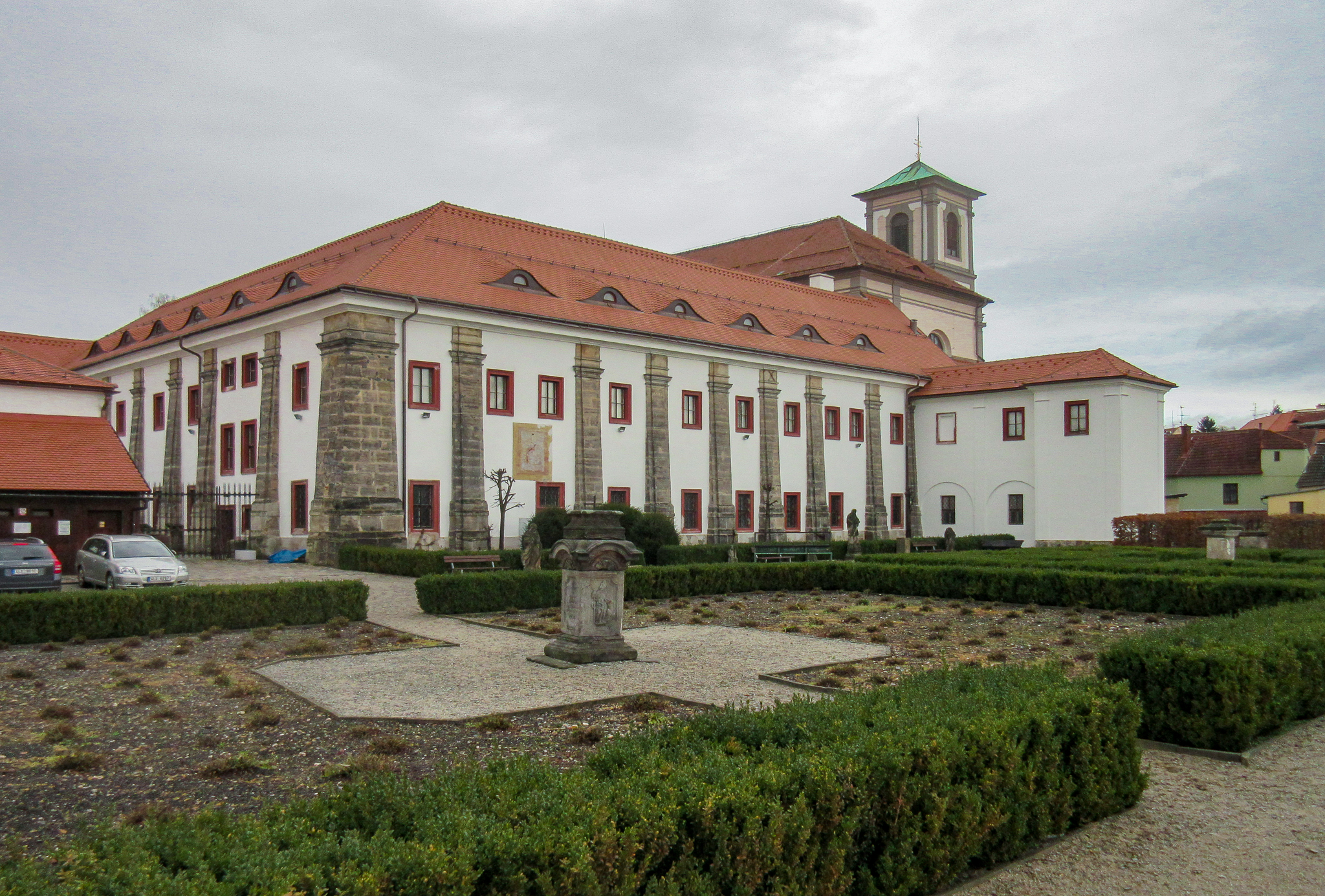
Augustinian monastery garden

The Crystal House of Culture is a multifunctional building in the town centre built in 1975–1990. It contains a cinema, two halls, a restaurant, a ballet hall and a gallery.

The Homeland Museum and Gallery in Česká Lípa is located in the grounds of a former Augustinian monastery. This museum focuses on the history and nature of the Česká Lípa region, zoology, geology, uranium mining in the region, and others. The museum also manages Šatlava – the archaeological museum of the Česká Lípa region, the Víska Magistrate in Kravaře, and the Karel Hynek Mácha Memorial in Doksy.

There is a three-floor municipal library on the square Náměstí T. G. Masaryka, which has three small branches in the town named Špičák, Lada and Holý vrch.

=== Cultural events ===
The town organises the Town Festivities at the beginning of every summer. This event first took place in the town park in 2000, to celebrate the park's 125th anniversary, moving to Náměstí T. G. Masaryka the following year. After Lipý Castle was renovated in 2003, the festival moved to its grounds, where it has been held since. The festival includes an antique fair, concerts, fireworks and theatre performances, and the Town Awards are presented.

The first annual Lípa Musica international festival was held in 2000, primarily featuring classical music. It is the most important festival of classical music in the North Bohemian region with an overlap to Germany. Concerts are held at several locations throughout the town.

== Sport ==
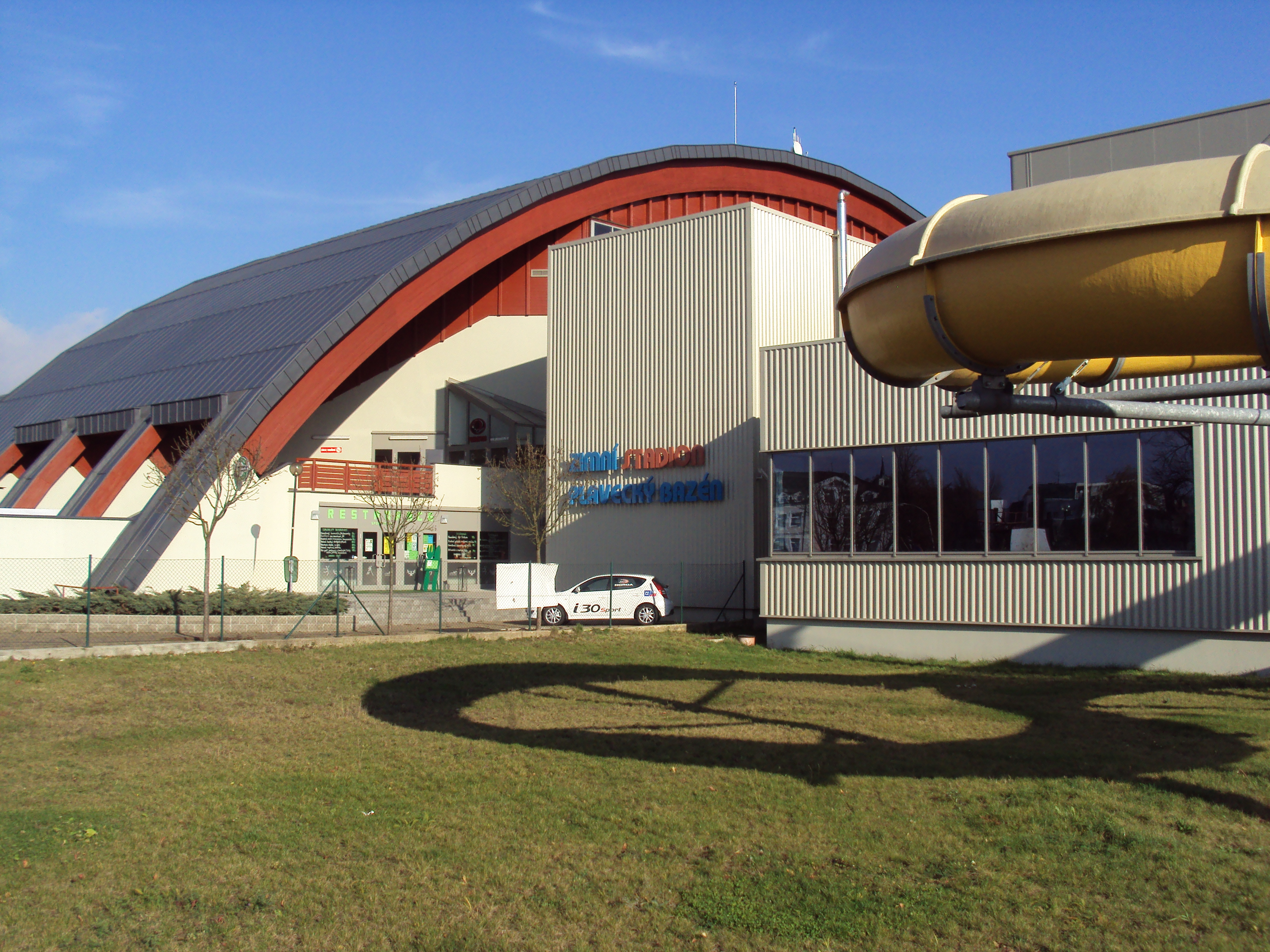
Winter stadium and neighbouring swimming pool

Sport Česká Lípa, a contributory organisation established by the town, manages local sports facilities including: U Ploučnice municipal stadium, which includes an open football pitch, 5. května football ground, tennis hall and outdoor tennis courts, Old Sports Hall, New Multi-purpose Hall, Sever Swimming Pool, and a sports complex featuring a winter stadium, an indoor pool with water slide, a sauna and fitness centre.

The town is home to Arsenal Česká Lípa, a football team playing in lower amateur tiers. TJ Lokomotiva Česká Lípa is a sports club with football, swimming, handball, volleyball, judo, rock climbing, table tennis and gymnastics sections.

Between the villages of Lada and Písečná, there is a sports airport where Aeroclub Česká Lípa operates.

== Sights ==
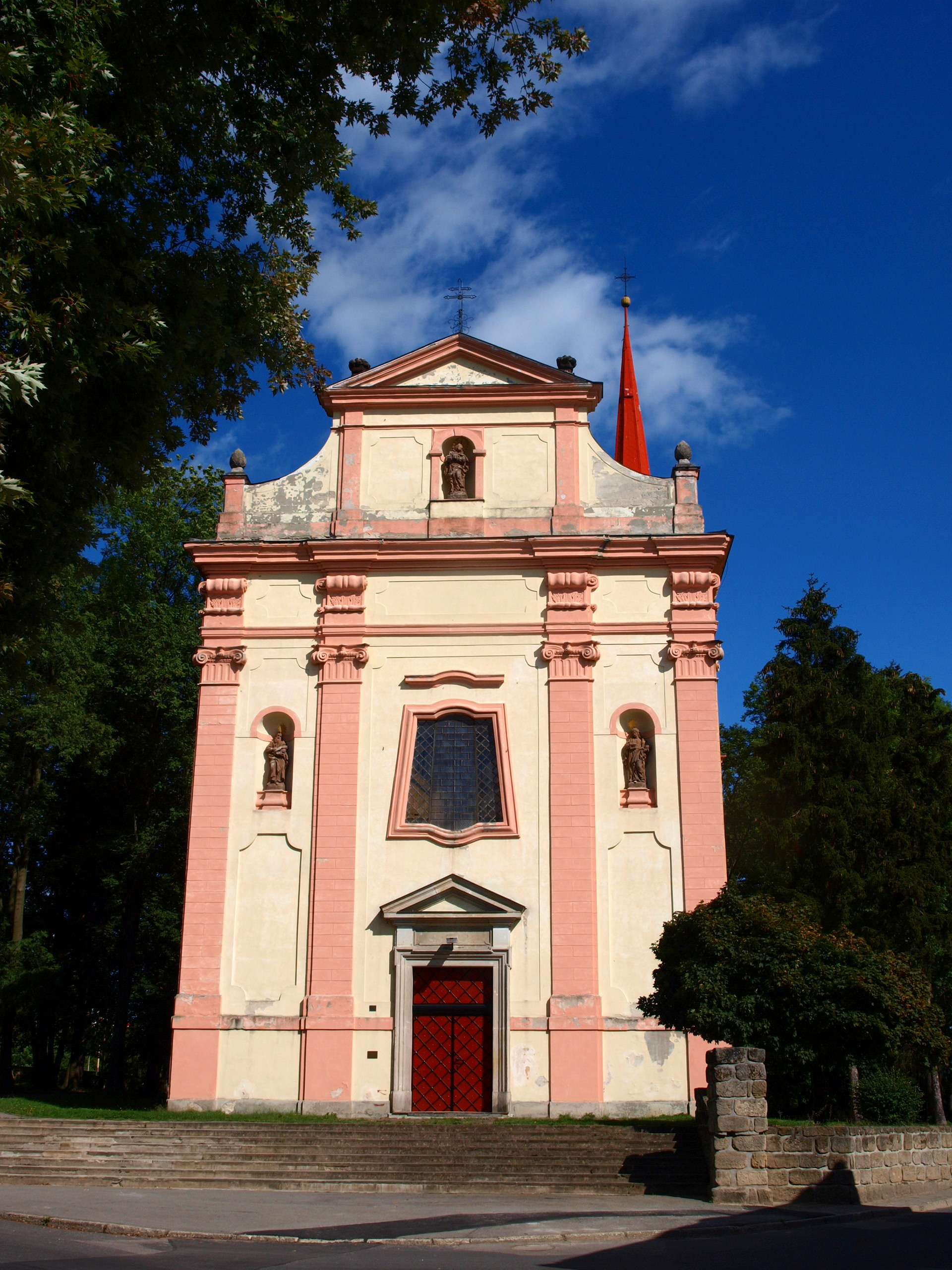
Church of the Nativity of the Virgin Mary

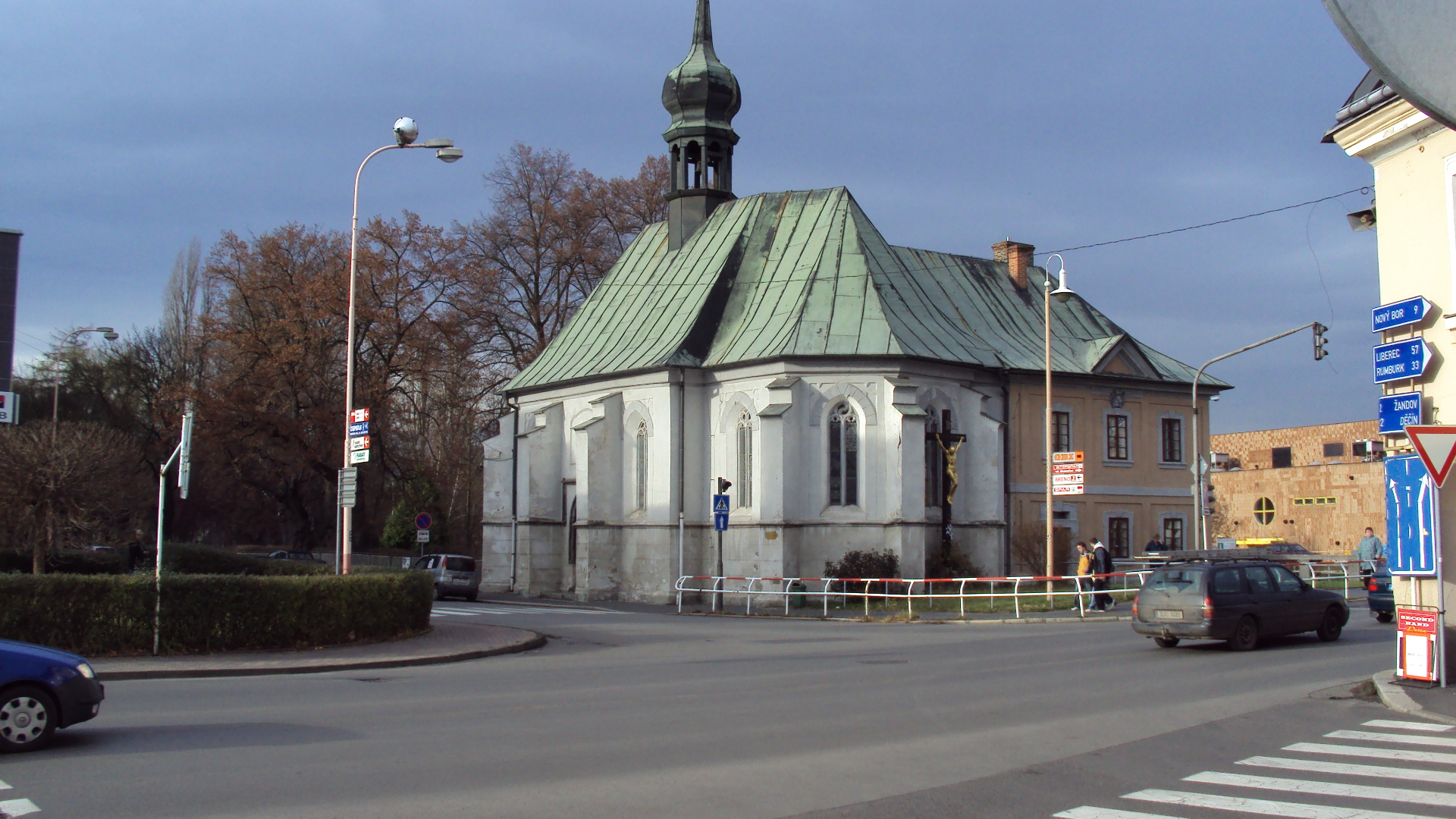
Church of Saint Mary Magdalene

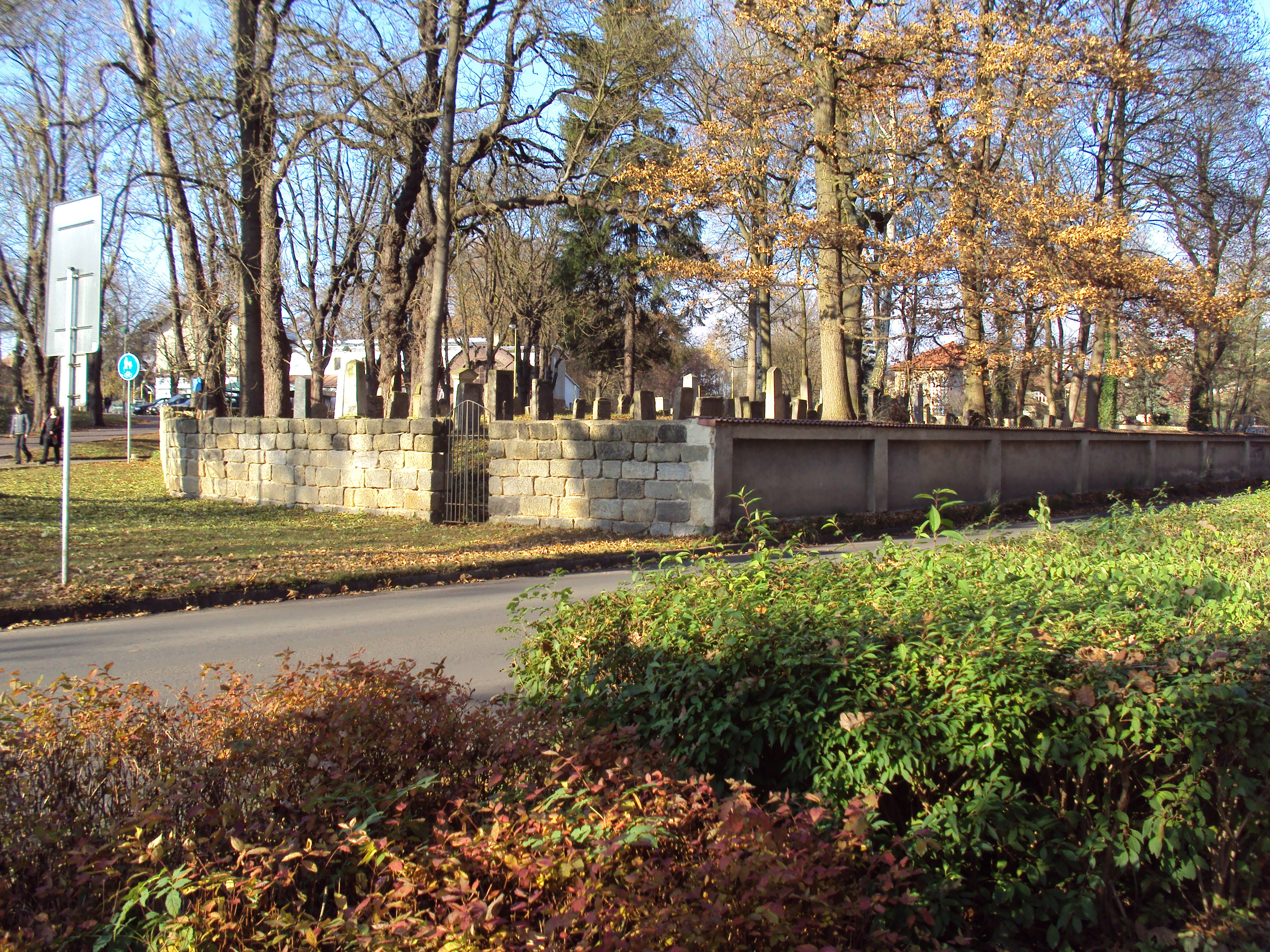
Jewish cemetery

=== Ecclesiastical monuments ===
The Augustinian monastery, located on what is today the square Náměstí Svobody, was founded by Albrecht von Wallenstein in 1627. The monastery complex was gradually built until the 1760s. The Loretan chapel dates from 1698, the Church of All Saints was completed in 1707, and the Chapel of the Holy Trinity dates from 1767. The monastery complex also once contained a school and printhouse. The Homeland Museum and Gallery in Česká Lípa is now located in the premises of the former monastery. The museum was founded in 1900 and has been based in the monastery premises since 1968.

The Church of the Nativity of the Virgin Mary on Palackého náměstí was built in the Baroque style in 1710–1714, but it has a Gothic core. The tower was added in 1873.

An old church was built in 1253 as part of the monastery hospital, but it was probably destroyed during the Hussite Wars. The Church of Saint Mary Magdalene was then founded on the site next to the former church by Jindřich Berka of Dubá around 1460, and was first documented in 1503. In 1514, it was rebuilt into its current late Gothic appearance. The provost office next to the church, today deanery of the Roman Catholic parish, was completed in 1756.

The Church of the Exaltation of the Holy Cross was built in the second half of the 14th century and is the oldest church in Česká Lípa. It has a Gothic core. In 1897, the building was adjusted to the neo-Gothic style by Josef Mocker.

The former Evangelic church was built for German Lutherans in 1927–1928. In 1946, it was taken over by the Czechoslovak Hussite Church and was renamed the Church of Master Jan Hus.

A notable monument remarking the Jewish community is the enclosed Old Jewish Cemetery from the 16th century. The site where a synagogue from the 1860s stood until its destruction by the Nazis in 1938 is marked by a historical memorial stone, installed in 2008.

=== Historic town centre ===
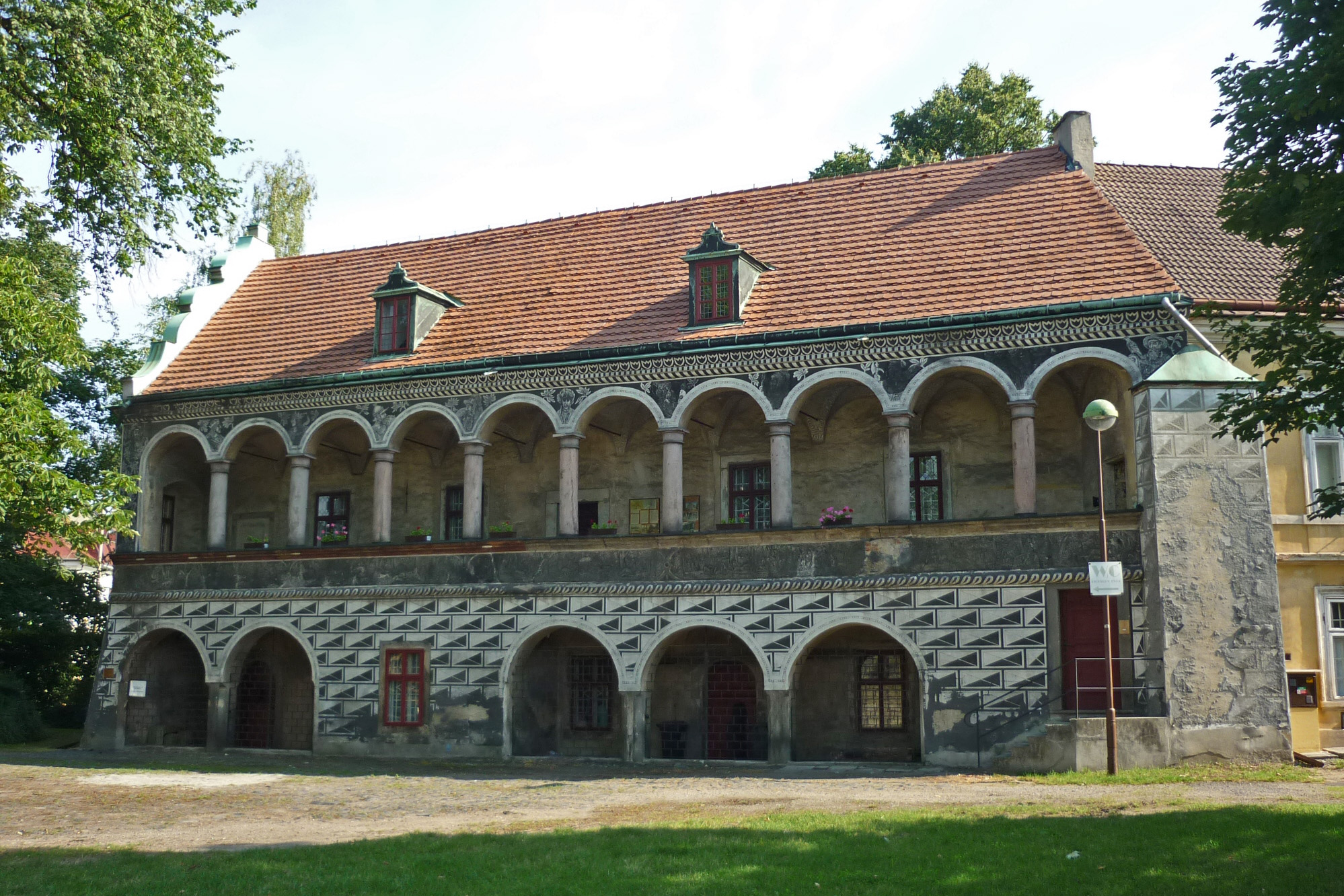
Red House

Lipý Castle is a water castle that was built in the 13th century by members of the Ronovci lineage, who later called themselves the Lords of Lipá. The castle was first documented in 1277. The original wooden building was built on an island between the arms of the Ploučnice river. The river was later rerouted. In 1515, part of the castle was rebuilt into a Renaissance palace. In the mid-17th century, Lipý Castle ceased to be the residence of the nobility and began to deteriorate. There was a sugar refinery in the castle in the 19th and early 20th centuries, and after the collapse of part of the castle, the building was demolished in 1957. In 1992, an archaeological survey and reconstruction of remains of the castle was started. Today, the castle ruin offers a sightseeing tour and the premises are also used for cultural purposes. The "Textile Print Centre" historical exhibition is located next to the castle.

The Červený dům ('Red House') near the Lipý Castle was built as a hunting lodge by Jetřich Jiří Berka of Dubá in 1583. It was built in the Renaissance style and decorated with sgraffiti. Currently, the building houses the workplace of the museum.

The town hall was built in 1515. In 1884, the façade was reconstructed in the Neo-Renaissance style. On the ground floor is the town information centre with a portal from 1555.

The Holy Trinity Column in the middle of the square Náměstí T. G. Masaryka was created in 1689 after the plague pandemic, which hit the town and surroundings in 1680. The second landmark of the town square is a fountain from 1837.

=== Technical monuments ===
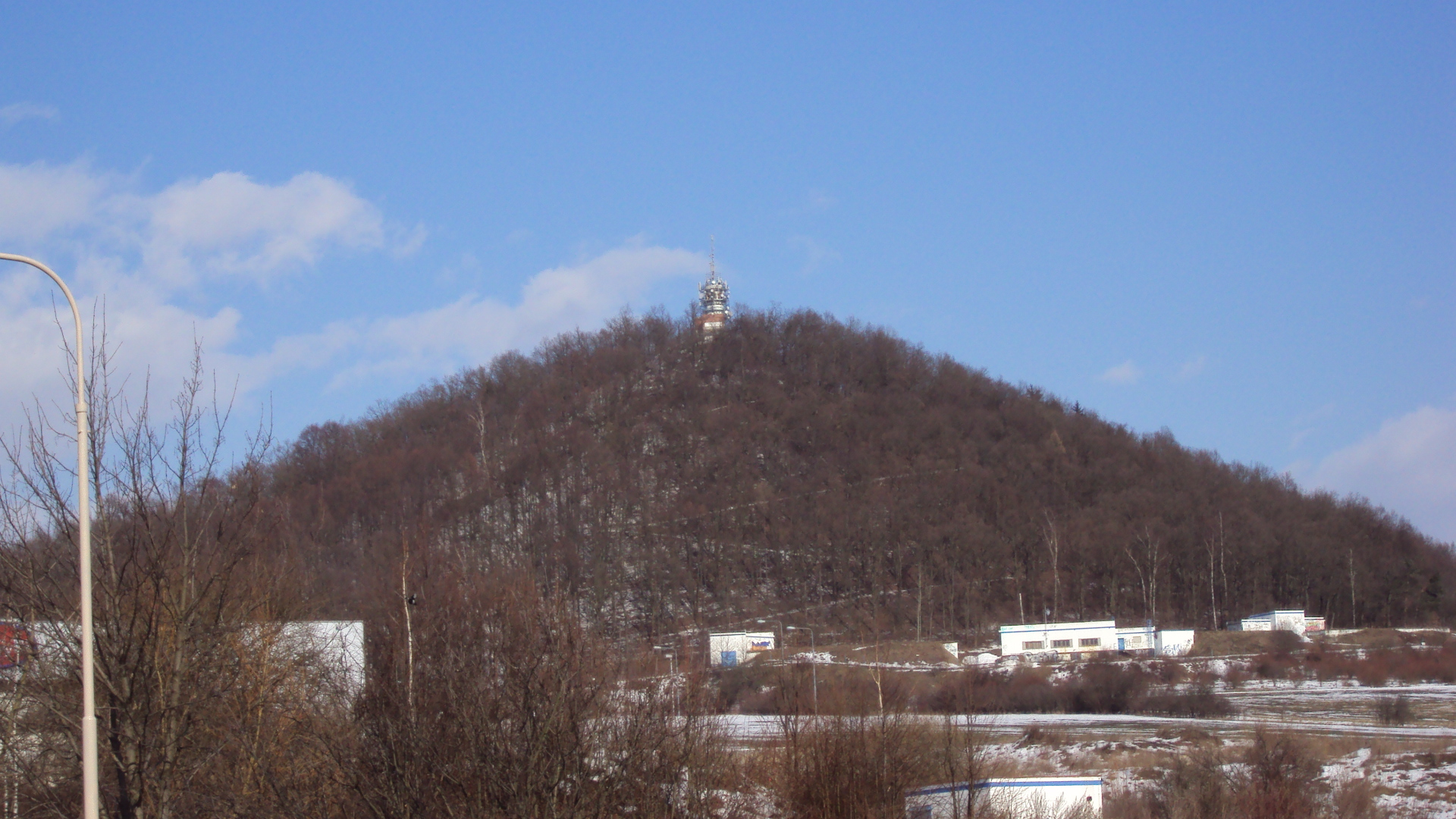
Špičák Hill with the observation tower

The Špičák Observation Tower is a 14-metre tower built on the Špičák hill in 1885. However, it was soon renovated and by 1906 there were 2,500 tourists recorded in its memorial book. It was used for anti-aircraft patrols in World War II. In 1997, it was renovated and converted into a radio and cellular phone networks transmitter. It is normally inaccessible, but it has occasionally been opened to the public.

A technical monument is the former hatch bridge weir on the Ploučnice. It was built in connection with the regulation of the river in 1910. The movement of the hatches suspended on the frames under the bridge automatically regulated the water level and the speed of the current with its pressure. It is now used as a footbridge.

== Notable people ==
- Anton Hickel (1745–1798), Austrian painter
- Hugo Salus (1866–1929), physician, writer and poet
- Leopold Moll (1877–1933), Austro-Hungarian paediatrician and court counsellor
- Erwin Sembach (1879–1919), opera singer
- Rudolf de la Vigne (1920–2004), German footballer
- Angela Jursitzka (born 1938), Austrian journalist and writer
- Petr Kellner (1964–2021), businessman
- Luboš Bartoň (born 1980), basketball player
- Tomáš Ladra (born 1997), footballer

== Twin towns – sister cities ==
Česká Lípa is twinned with:

- Bardejov, Slovakia
- Bolesławiec, Poland
- Mittweida, Germany
- Molde, Norway
- Uzhhorod, Ukraine
