= Erwin Sembach =

Austrian opera singer

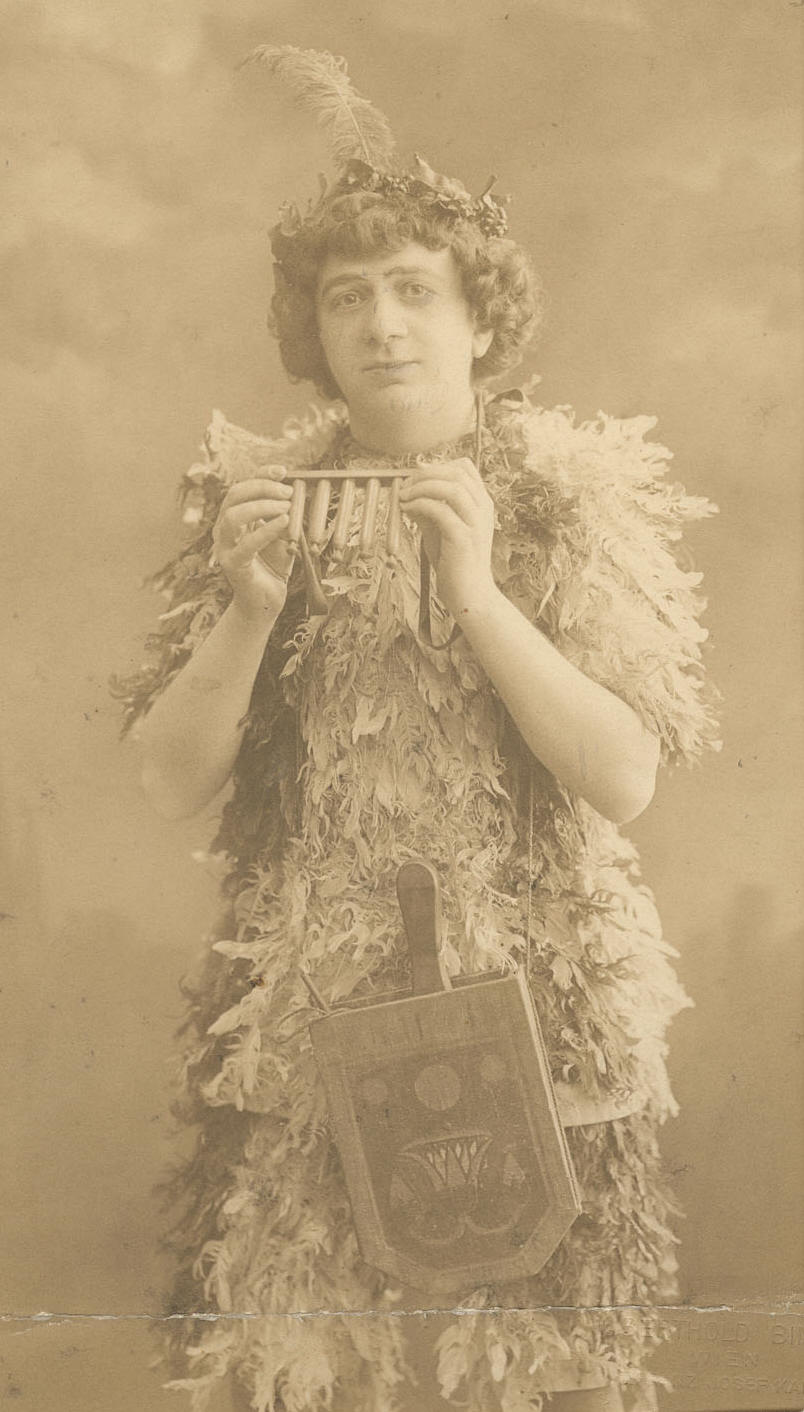
As Papageno in Mozart's opera The Magic Flute

Erwin Schück (1879 – 1919), better known by his stage name Erwin Sembach, was an opera singer with the Vienna Volksoper during its earliest years of producing operas, immediately before and during World War I. His greatest roles there were Masetto in Mozart's Don Giovanni, Papageno in Mozart's The Magic Flute, and Krušina in Smetana's The Bartered Bride.

(There was a successful German opera singer using the stage name Johannes Sembach during this same period, which may lead to some confusion when newspaper articles simply refer to the singer as "Herr Sembach".)

== Biography ==
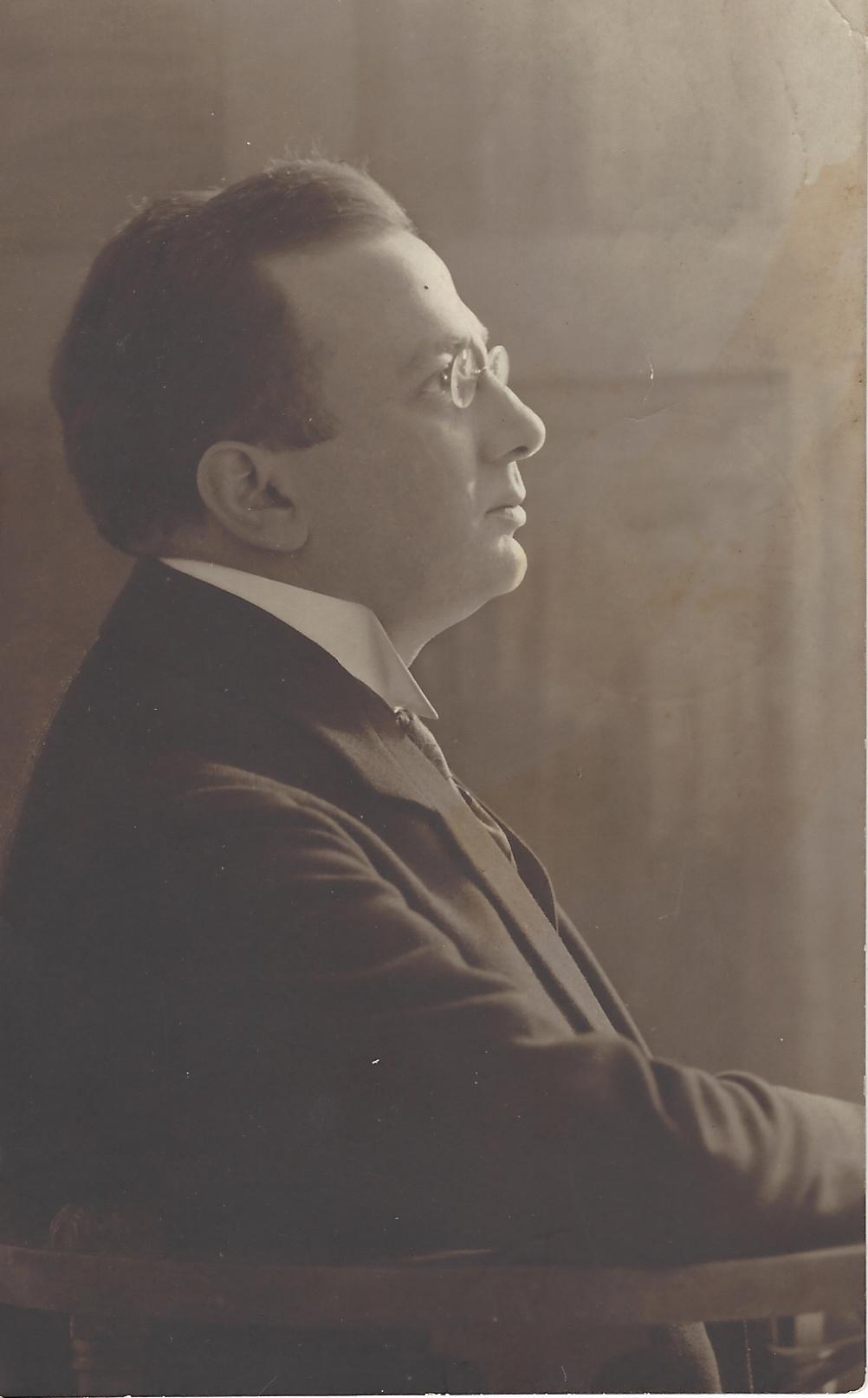
Erwin Sembach in 1915

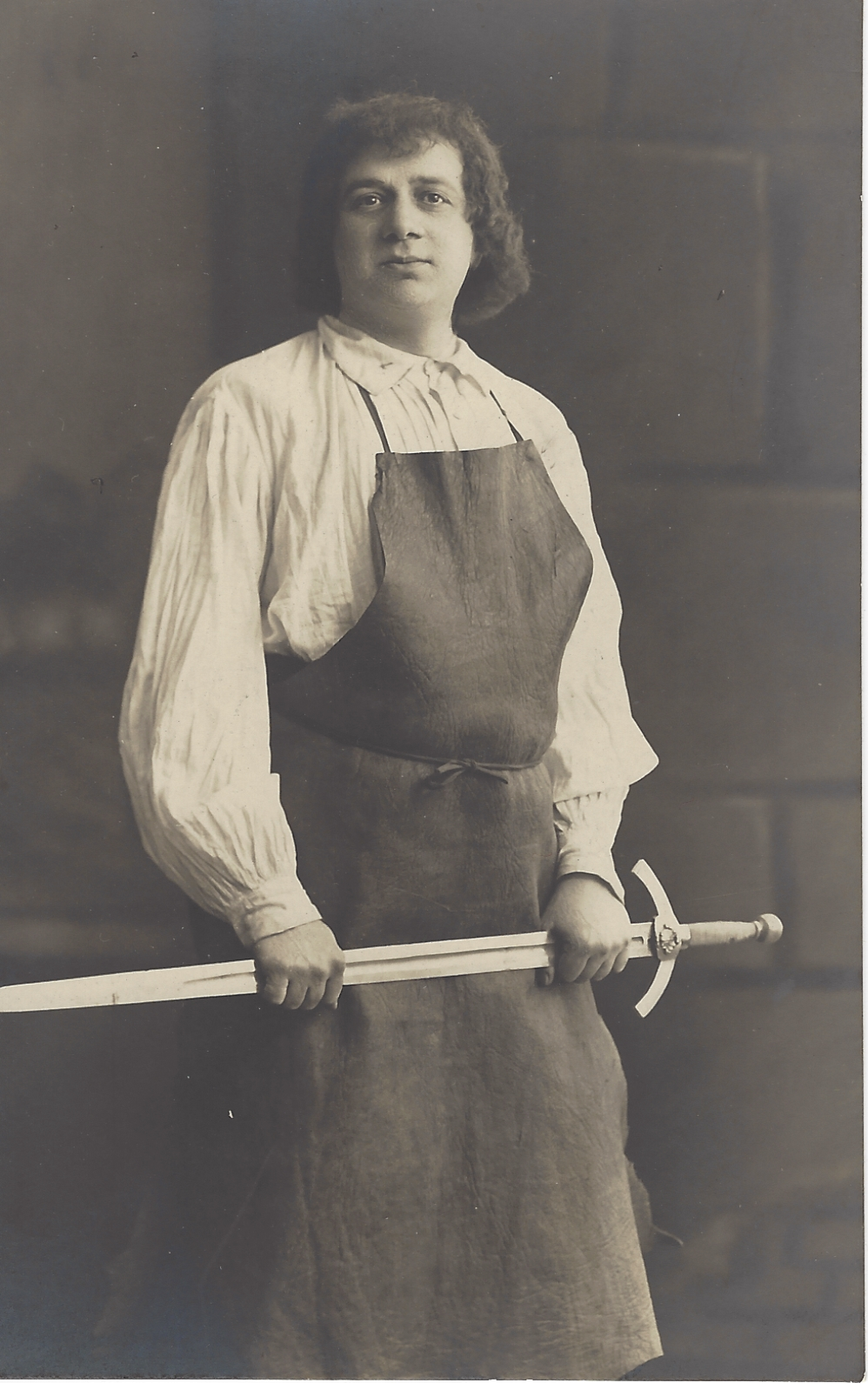
In the title role of Wagner's opera Siegfried

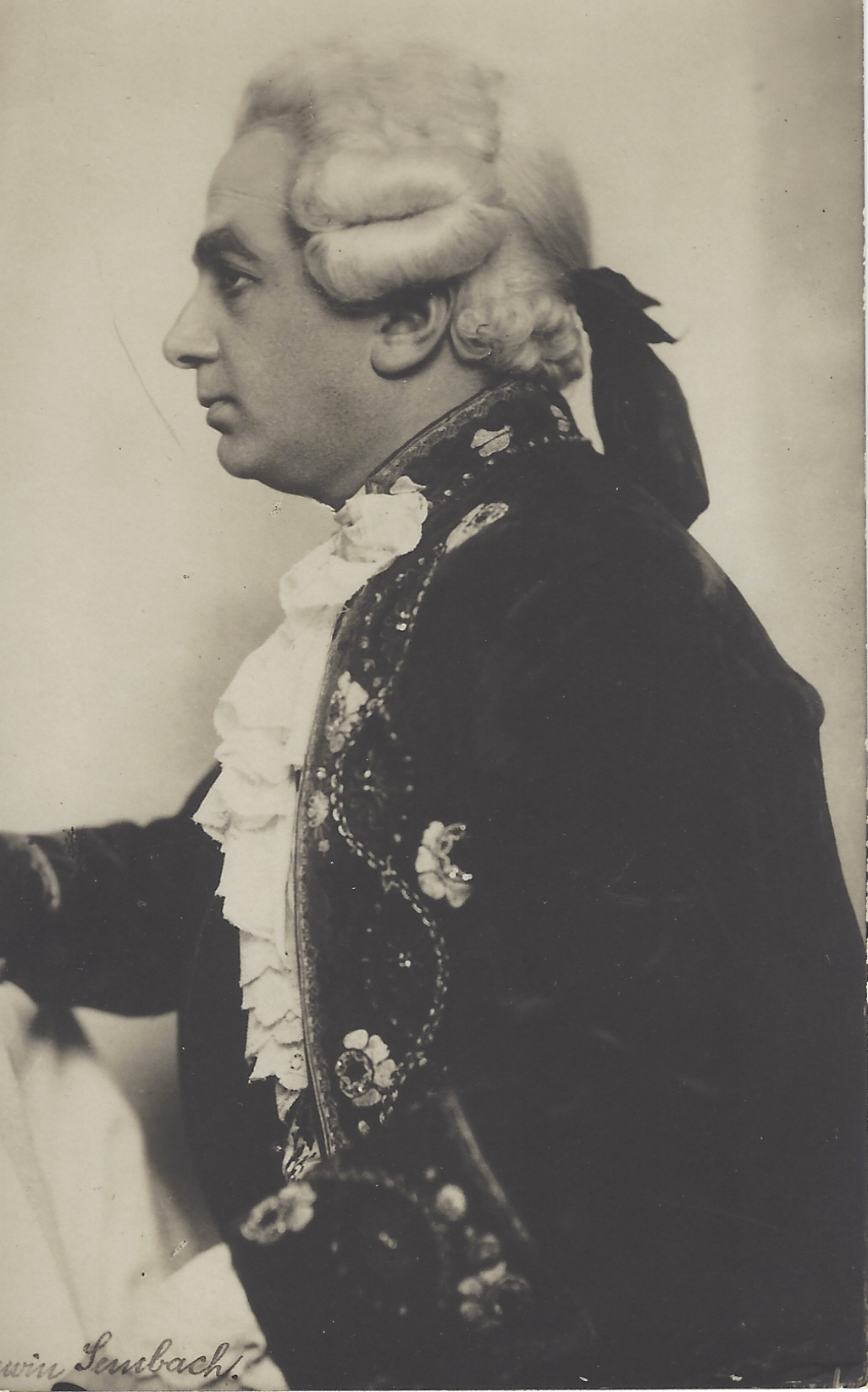
In operatic costume

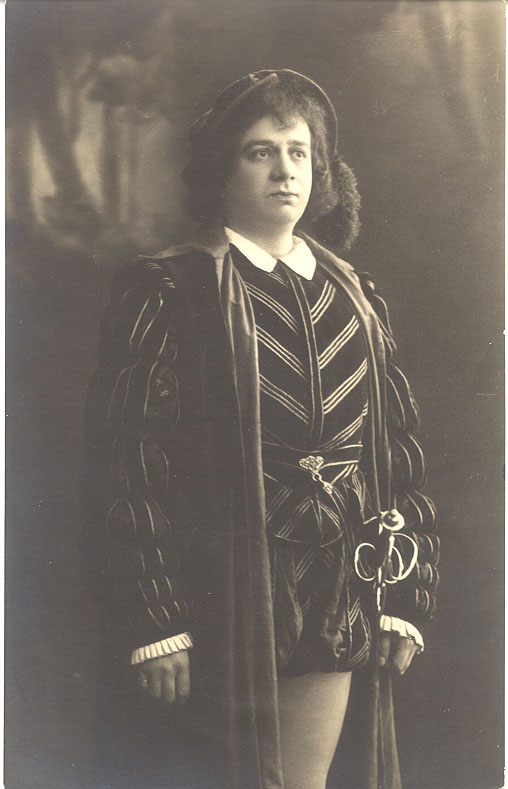
In operatic costume

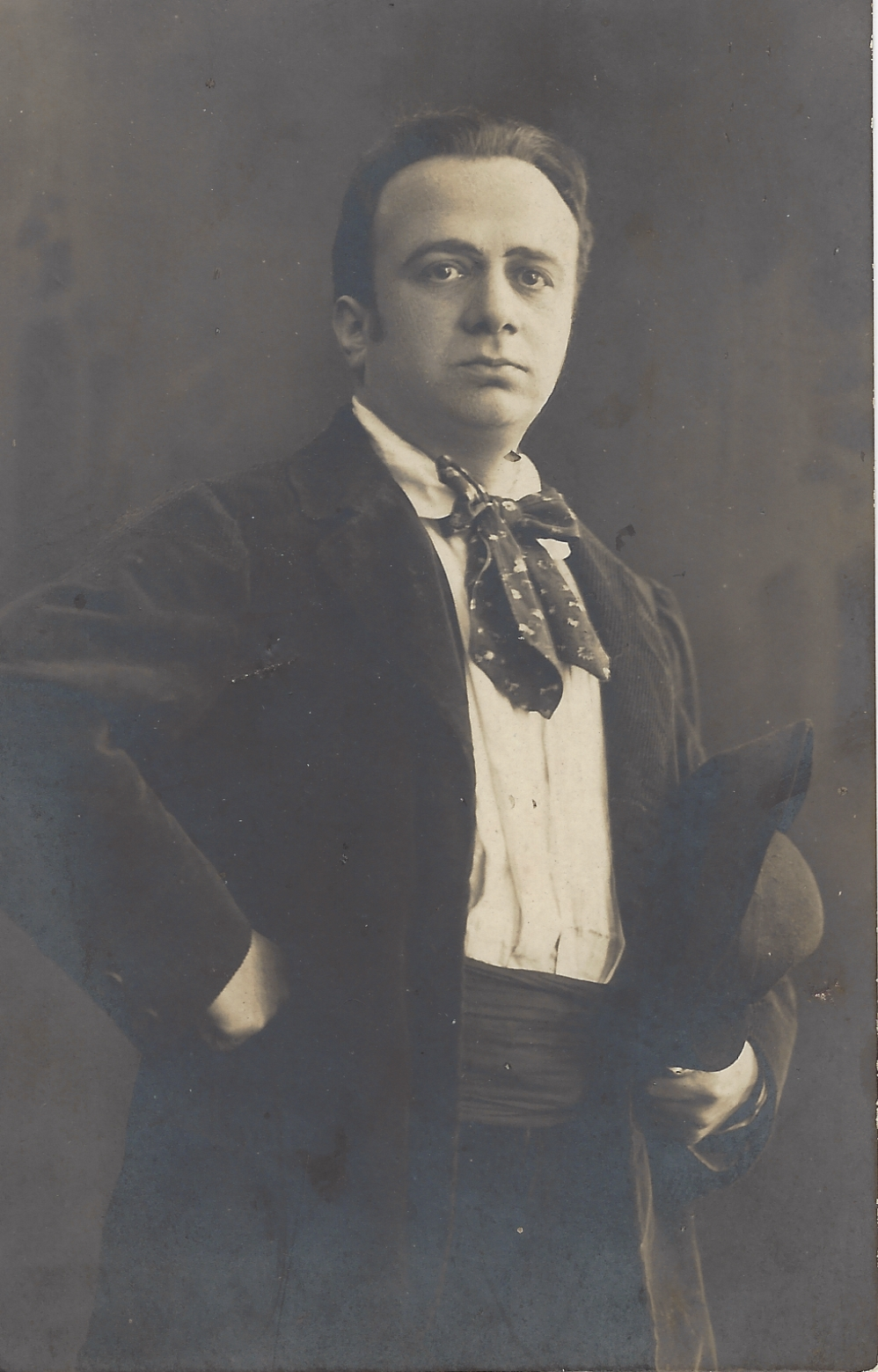
In operatic costume

Erwin Sembach was born on 18 October 1879 in Böhmisch Leipa (now Česká Lípa in the Czech Republic) to parents Adolf Schück and Katharina Schreiber who owned and operated a millinery and accessories shop in the town. Sembach was the oldest of eight siblings. He married Marie "Mietze" Klaus in 1902. They had a daughter Margarete Schück (1903-1930) and a son Wolfgang Schück (1905-1979).

Sembach's family was quite musical, and as a young man he trained to be a singer. He was naturally a baritone, but trained himself to also sing tenor, so that he could qualify for more roles such as Wagner's Lohengrin and Siegfried. By 1910 Sembach and his family were living in Vienna, the music capital of Europe, and Sembach was singing operatic roles. He was a member of the Vienna Volksoper opera house from at least 1912 through 1917. In addition to the Volksoper, Sembach also performed at the Simplicissimus, a well known cabaret that still operates in Vienna.

Sembach died of nephrotic syndrome and uremia in his home town Böhmisch Leipa on 8 October 1919 at the age of 40, following a long illness.

== Operatic roles ==
- Dr. Grenvil (bass) in La traviata by Giuseppe Verdi, Vienna, 1912–1913
- Brander in Faust by Charles Gounod, Vienna, 1913
- Der Kuhreigen by Wilhelm Kienzl, Plzeň, 1913
- Masetto (bass) in Don Giovanni by Wolfgang Mozart, Vienna, 1913
- Papageno (baritone) in The Magic Flute by Wolfgang Mozart, Vienna, 1914
- Fritz Kottner (baritone) in Die Meistersinger von Nürnberg by Richard Wagner, Vienna, 1914
- Jean in Bei Sedan by Heinrich Zöllner, Vienna, 1914
- Rodolphe in Der Überfall by Heinrich Zöllner, Vienna, 1914
- Count Liebnau (baritone) in Der Waffenschmied by Albert Lorzing, Vienna, 1914
- Count Ceprano (bass) in Rigoletto by Giuseppe Verdi, Vienna, 1914–1915
- Krušina (baritone) in The Bartered Bride by Bedřich Smetana, Vienna, 1915
- Reinmar von Zweter (bass) in Tannhäuser by Richard Wagner, Vienna, 1913–1915
- Silvio (baritone) in Pagliacci by Ruggero Leoncavallo, Vienna, 1915
- Fiorello (bass) in The Barber of Seville by Gioachino Rossini, Vienna, 1915

== Recitals ==
- Ústí nad Labem, 9 April 1905
- Vienna, 2 November 1910
- Vienna, 8 January 1912
- Vienna, 15 November 1912
- Olomouc, 29 November 1913
- Vienna, 20 February 1914
- Vienna, June 1915
- Česká Lípa, September 1918
