= Leopold Moll =

Austro-Hungarian paediatrician, court counsellor, teacher

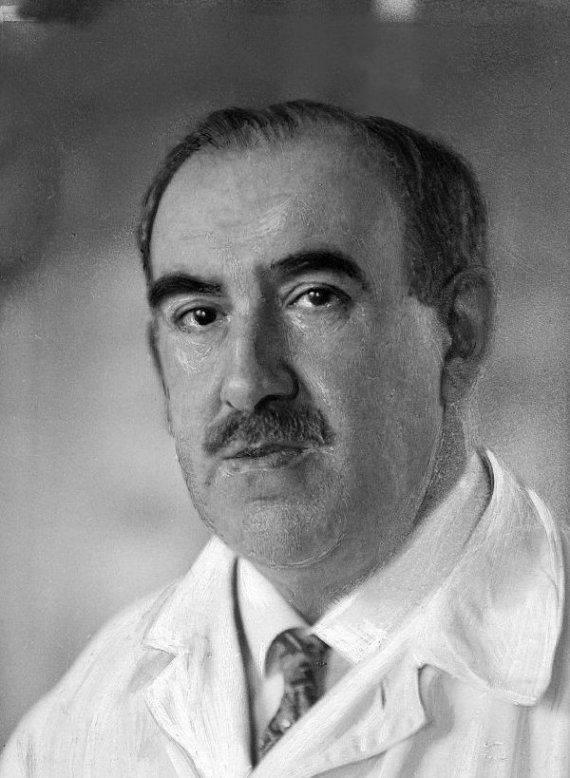
Leopold Moll

Leopold Moll (March 2, 1877 – February 21, 1933) was an Austro-Hungarian paediatrician, court counsellor, teacher and organiser of social paediatric care. He was the founder and long-time director of the Institute for Maternity and Infant Care in Vienna. Moll was author of many scientific studies and books on both medical and social care for new-borns and children. He founded many foundations and social services to orphans and women with children.

== Life and career ==
Moll was born on March 2, 1877, into a Jewish family at what was then known as Böhmisch Leipa. His father was Wilhelm Moll, a master butcher, running this trade just like his father; his mother was Rosa Moll, also from a trader family. Moll studied primary and secondary school in his birthplace, and went to the German University in Prague to study medicine, which he finished in 1902. Then he worked as an assistant to Julius Pohl at the Institute of Pharmacology in Prague. In 1904–1910, he was an assistant to paediatrician Alois Epstein at the Prague University Children’s Hospital, where he became acquainted with the issues of infant nutrition and nutritional disorders, which became his lifelong focus. In 1909, he habilitated at Prague University with the thesis 'Clinical Importance of the Phosphorus Excretion in Urine of Infants'.

Shortly afterwards, Moll left for Vienna, where he habilitated one year later. Immediately after arrival in Vienna, he attracted substantial attention with his plans to introduce systematic care for mothers and new-borns, and in 1910 he was commissioned to build the Imperial Central Institute for Maternal and Infant Care in Vienna-Glanzing. This project was to be built with funding of 2 million Austrian crowns donated by people for the 60th birthday of Emperor Franz Joseph I, as a model project for the monarchy. The institute opened in 1915 and Moll remained, until his death, its administrative and medical director, as well as founder of a professional school for nurses. These so-called 'Moll sisters' substantially contributed to spreading his style of work and ideas in care for mothers and infants.

Moll published his ideas and scientific findings, primarily in the fields of dietetic issues in physiological infants and children with absorption disorders. In clinical practice, his name was associated with the widely used calcium Moll milk, almond milk and 'keksmilch'. He was one of the first paediatricians to focus on the nutrition of premature infants. He wrote a number of medical books, as well as articles on the organization of social services for mothers and children. Published in many editions were his educational books for the general public, entitled Preschool Child, its Care, Nutrition and Education and Maternal Courses, Lecture Cycle for Caring Mothers.

During the difficult times of World War I, he personally helped to organize care for war orphans, and as early as in 1914, he initiated the creation of the so-called 'war sponsorship', which continued to function as 'national sponsorship' after the war. Through these foundations, mothers with young children, whose husbands had been conscripted or served in the army, were provided with material support to secure better and healthier nutrition for their children. He actively promoted the introduction of the system of guardianship, or foster care, which he considered much better for raising children that placement in orphanages. He acquired a villa on the Riviera for Austrian war orphans and took them there for recreation. In 1921, he founded the 'Unified Health Insurance for Children Endangered by Tuberculosis', later renamed 'for Children with Endangered Health'. This organization, commonly known as the 'Moll's Action' operated for fifteen years.

Leopold Moll was appointed professor in 1920 and later a court councillor for his scientific and educational activities.

Moll and his wife Marie had a single son. Moll died on February 21, 1933, in Vienna, at age 55. In 1937, his memorial by the academic sculptor Joseph Heu was unveiled at the Children’s Clinic in Vienna-Glanzing. During the German occupation of Austria, his memory was suppressed due to his Jewish origin. At the grand representative exhibition Vienna – Prague in the Hybern Palace in 1990, portraits of ten men who most contributed to Vienna’s fame were presented. Moll was among them.

== Literature ==
- Panacek M., Gut J.: Professor Dr. Leopold Moll, in the periodical Cesko-Slovenska pediatrie (Czech and Slovak paediatrics) 2019 No. 4, p. 244 - 245
- dtto, for registered members at
- Leopold Moll: Institute for Maternity and Infant Care in Vienna, 1919; scanned in pdf at Die Reichsanstalt für Mutter- und Säuglingsfürsorge in Wien
- Leopold Moll: Suckling and Toddler - A memory book for mothers for the care, nutrition and education of the suckling and toddler, Vienna 1925 (Säugling und Kleinkind - Ein Merkbuch für Mütter zur Pflege, Ernährung und Erziehung des Säuglings und Kleinkindes)
- Leopold Moll: Ten Years of Institute for Maternity and Infant Care in Vienna, 1925; scanned in pdf at Zehn Jahre Kinderfürsorge der Reichsanstalt für Mutter- und Säuglingsfürsorge in Wien
- Leopold Moll: The child of pre-school age, his care, nutrition and education, Vienna 1927 (Das Kind im vorschulpflichtigen Alter, seine Pflege, Ernährung und Erziehung)
- Leopold Moll: Memorial book for my child. With a guide to the nutrition, care and education of the child, Vienna 1932 (Gedenkbuch für mein Kind. Mit einem Leitfaden zur Ernährung, Pflege und Erziehung des Kindes)
- Institut für Neuzeit- und Zeitgeschichtsforschung - Österreichisches Biographisches Lexikon: Moll, Leopold (1877-1933), Pädiater
