= Angela Jursitzka =

Austrian journalist and writer (born 1938)

Angela Jursitzka (born 1938 in Česká Lípa) is an Austrian journalist and writer. In 1946, she was expelled from Czechoslovakia together with the majority of Sudeten Germans, and came to Tyrol. At the age of 50, she began to write.

== Publications ==
- Gauner Gold und Erdbeereis. Jugendkriminalroman. Berenkamp Verlag, Schwaz 1994. ISBN 3-85093-034-3
- Das Gähnen der Götter. Tirol vor 2299 Jahren. Roman. 2003. ISBN 3-85361-092-7
- Alle Kriege wieder. Eine Historie. Verlag Bibliothek der Provinz, Weitra 2015. ISBN 978-3-99028-466-7
