= Old Jewish Cemetery, Česká Lípa =

Cemetery in Northern Bohemia, Czech Republic

Old Jewish Cemetery in Česká Lípa
- Czech: Starý židovský hřbitov v České Lípě
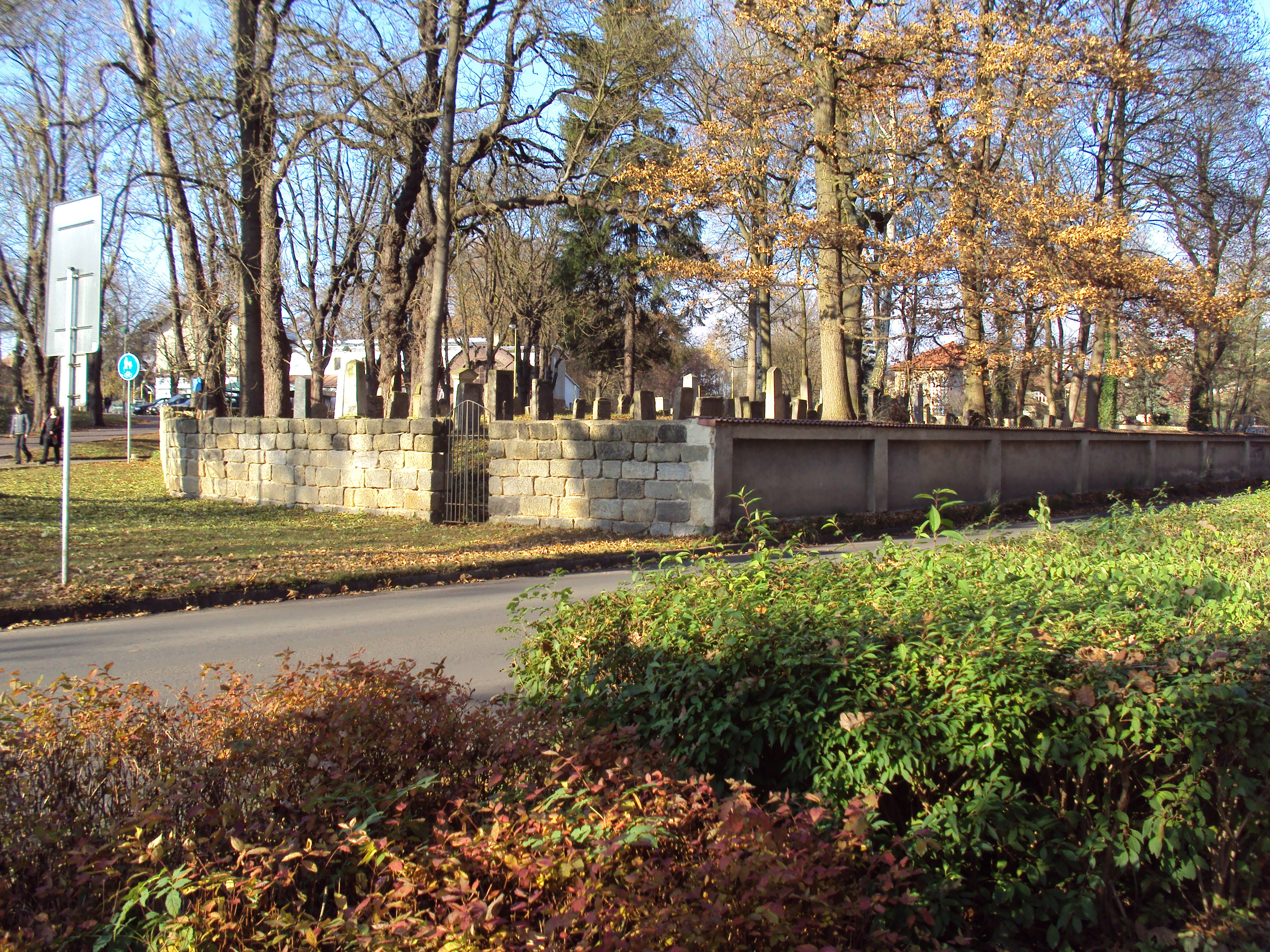

Details
- Established: Before 1575
- Country: Czech Republic
- Coordinates: 50°41′28″N 14°32′05″E

The Old Jewish Cemetery in Česká Lípa (Czech: Starý židovský hřbitov v České Lípě, Hebrew: בית קברות עתיק לאיפה, German: Alter jüdischer Friedhof im Böhmisch Leipa) is one of the oldest preserved Jewish cemeteries in Northern Bohemia, Czech Republic. It is located in the northwestern part of the town near the town park.

== Background ==
Jews have been documented in Česká Lípa since Berka of Dubá and the House of Wartenberg. Jews had certainly lived in the area for several generations before the Battle of White Mountain. The Wartenberg residence Neuschloss (Gardens) was then one of the most exhibited Renaissance settlements of the Czech nobility in this region. Registries from the 19th century state that a number of the deceased said they were families of the lords of the garden – the "Neuschlosserherrschaft-Familiant". After the Battle of White Mountain, the local estates belonged to Albrecht of Wallenstein for a time, and after his murder in 1634 they passed along a family line through his widow Isabel of Harrach and later daughter Maria Elisabeth of Frýdlant into the Kounice family, who held Lípa until the abolition of serfdom in 1848.

== History ==
The first written source confirming the presence of Jews in Česká Lípa comes according to data in Gold from 1570, and the earliest physically preserved evidence of the existence of the Jewish quarter, synagogue and cemetery from 1699, in a report on the Jewish presence in the town. According to Gold, the land for the old cemetery was donated to the local Jews by Jan of Wartenberg at the end of the 16th century. The burghers of Lípa felt damaged and affected, and there was even a lawsuit regarding the matter, as the town considered all the land near the so-called Ziegelteich as their property.

The Old Jewish Cemetery in Česká Lípa was founded before 1575 beyond the town walls (some theories claim that the cemetery was founded as early as 1479). It was expanded in 1758 and was used until 1905. That year, the New Jewish Cemetery was founded at the northeastern outskirts, next to the municipal cemetery, but this cemetery was desecrated and completely destroyed between the 1940s and 1980s. The old cemetery was destroyed by the Nazis in 1938, and some of the tombstones were taken away and used to fill the river arm of the Ploučnice.

=== 18th century ===
Gold's collaborator Rabbi Bernard Wolf, who compiled the motto "Leipe", also lists the families from 1724, where he mentions 358 people and the fact that then two thirds of Leipzig's Jewry were old local families, about a third then Jews came from across the area and other countries, many of whose names can be found on tombs in the cemetery.

In December 1744, there was a pogrom against Jews by the Prussian pandurs of Major (Lieutenant) Schimpsen in Česká Lípa. The pogrom lasted from about 10am to 4pm, and left 30 dead and 40 injured. The cash and goods seized totalled about 30,000 gold. The local Jews fled from the town to hide in the woods. Some of the wounded and dead were not found until several weeks after the incident, according to period sources. In the cemetery there is still a monument (No. 062) built by the local Chevra Kadisha on the anniversary of this event. The monument is now badly damaged. There are only three tombstones in the cemetery dating to 1744. (Nos. 021, 023 and 052), but these are tombstones of people who died before the date of the pogrom.

=== 19th century ===
In 1850, a wave of cholera and dysentery hit Česká Lípa. According to the registries, this year shows probably the highest number of deaths. Given not only the higher percentage of Jewish settlement, but especially the cause of death.

The local Beit-Olam is so small that experts believe – given that the area of the cemetery is somehow higher than the rest of the terrain – that there was burial in layers – however, this is only a presumption if not likely. If burials were done in Česká Lípa, in the 1920s the cemetery would have to look roughly the same as the old Prague cemetery. A Jewish community with functioning Chevra Kadisha, Naase mitzvot, Bikur cholim, and Banot Zion (female offshoot of Chevra Kadisha) would find it difficult to allow older matzevas to remain covered in soil and not be planted on the surface. After all, flat (buried) older tombstones would also make further burials considerably more difficult. On the other hand, it is documented that the old cemetery was demolished by the Nazis during the war. A number of tombstones were forcibly removed and used to fill the Ploučnice arm.

=== 20th century ===
The last burial in the cemetery was held in 1905, and the Jews established a new burial ground. From about 1903 to 1905, there was still a kind of Jewish department at the communal cemetery. The new cemetery with a ceremonial building in the Moorish style survived the war, but was liquidated, sold and robbed in the years of normalization around 1983.

In the 1990s, the cemetery underwent extensive reconstruction. The repair, modification and partial revitalization of the old cemetery was completed in 1999. After the modifications, half of the cemetery became a lapidary.

Rabbi Bernard Wolf also mentions in Gold that the registries of the dead began to be kept consistently from 1782. However, the online registries made available by the research room only include volumes iii. and iv, covering 1839–1865 and 1875–1949 respectively.

== Present day ==
Approximately 140 tombstones have been preserved to this day, the oldest of which dates from 1682. Most of the tombstones date from the 17th and 18th centuries and are massive stelae. Burials took place in several layers in the cemetery, because further expansion at the existing site was not possible, similar to the Old Jewish cemetery in Prague.

One of the graves is marked by a granite tombstone in the shape of a black prism, which commemorates the community's rabbi and other 31 victims of a pogrom from 1745. The oldest tombstone from 1682 was found during a survey carried out by the State Jewish Museum in Prague. Because Jewish faith does not allow manipulation of graves, the existence of older graves in the lower layer cannot be documented. The antiquity of the tombstones is redeemed by the fact that all epitaphs are relatively laconic, containing only basic data. The newer ones are stolen.

The cemetery is now protected as a cultural monument of the Czech Republic, entered in the national register under number 24003/5-2778. It is bordered by a wall and locked.
