= Old Jewish Cemetery, Chernihiv =

Historic cemetery in Chernihiv Oblast, Ukraine

Old Jewish Cemetery
- Interactive map of Old Jewish Cemetery

Details
- Location: Liubetska Street, Chernihiv, Chernihiv Oblast, Ukraine
- Coordinates: 51°29′33″N 31°16′9″E
- Type: Jewish
- Owned by: City of Chernihiv
- Size: 4.6 hectare
- No. of graves: unknown

The Old Jewish Cemetery (Ukrainian: Старий єврейський цвинтар) is a historic cemetery located on Liubetska Street, Chernihiv, Chernihiv Oblast, Ukraine.

== History ==
The date of the foundation of the cemetery can not be precisely determined, but appeared in the first or second half of the nineteenth century, when this territory was bought out by the Jewish community.

The exact date of the foundation of the necropolis is unknown. Appeared in the first or second quarter of the nineteenth century. on land specially purchased by the Jewish community, after the formation of the Peter and Paul Cemetery. The majority of the Jewish community in Chernihiv consisted of Hasids and Ashkenazi, only 0.11% were Orthodox. It is probable that there was a house at the cemetery for ritual washing (at least, this was required by tradition).

The area of the cemetery fluctuated. During the twentieth century. it almost doubled: from 2.5 hectares (1908) to 4.6 hectares (1953). Currently, the territory of the Jewish cemetery is 4.3 hectares. At the same time, no more than 60% of the total area of the necropolis is occupied by burials.

The bulk of the tombstones of the first existence of the necropolis was destroyed, the earliest that have survived to the present, belong to the last quarter of the nineteenth century. The cemetery suffered significant damage during the German-Soviet war.

In the postwar period, the Soviet government began a new round of anti-Semitism, in particular, in 1959 the last functioning synagogue in the city was closed and the Chernihiv Jewish community was deregistered with the wording "for systematic gross violation of the law on religious cults" (in Russian); In 1961, propaganda was carried out in the local press, and in 1968 the cemetery, which still had plenty of free space for burial, was forcibly closed. The last burials were made in the mid-1970s.

On the territory of the Jewish cemetery of Chernihiv you can see samples of above-ground crypts and traditional Jewish burial monuments - matzevot. Most of the tombstones of the XIX - early XX century decorated with epitaphs in Hebrew, bilingual - Hebrew and Russian, or only Russian with the use of Jewish symbols: menorah, hexagram, etc. Tombstones of the twentieth century. almost all are marked in Russian.

Currently, the cemetery is maintained by members of the Chernihiv Jewish community BEF Hasde-Esther and the city's utilities. The vast majority of burials are in a very dilapidated condition. Vandalism is occasionally observed, probably by far-right groups.

== Interesting Facts ==
- Following the news of the defeat at Stalingrad during the German-Soviet War, Romanian soldiers were shot dead by the Nazis in the southeast corner of the cemetery. At the same time, Wehrmacht troops destroyed the crypts and tombstones in the central part of the cemetery with tanks.
- In the western corner of the cemetery is assumed the existence of a mass grave of soldiers who died during the liberation of Chernihiv in September 1943.
- During the Nazi occupation of the city, fearing arrests and pogroms during burials in its cemetery, the Jewish community tried to bury its members in the Peter and Paul Cemetery. However, anti-Semites from the Russian Orthodox Church, believing the necropolis to be created exclusively for their denomination, began to show intolerance towards such burials. The case when the tomb of a Jew was desecrated and the coffin with the deceased was thrown out and set on fire is significant.
- The main type of tombstone among the Jews is considered to be a matzevo - a vertical tombstone, decorated with carvings and an expansive epitaph. The order of decoration of the matzevot was strictly regulated, for men and women the images were different. Sometimes the name of the deceased was not indicated, only the occupation. Most matzevot were made of stone, but there was a rare option - a plate of wood. Such a matzevot, made of oak, has been preserved in the Jewish cemetery (now located in the Jewish community of Chernihiv).

== See also ==
- List of cemeteries in Chernihiv

== Links ==
- wikimapia.org
- Містична екскурсія з Ервіном Міденом по Староруському кладовищу в Чернігові
