= Palazzo Colleoni alla Pace =

Palace in Brescia, Italy

Palazzo Colleoni della Pace
- Entrance to the palace
- Interactive map of the Palazzo Colleoni della Pace area

General information
- Location: Brescia, Italy, Via della Pace, 10
- Coordinates: 45°32′24″N 10°12′55″E
- Year built: 15th century
- Client: Bartolomeo Colleoni
- Owner: Fathers of Peace

Palazzo Colleoni alla Pace is a historical building in Brescia located at Via della Pace, in the heart of the historic center of the city.

Built in the middle of the 15th century for the Bergamasque condottiere Bartolomeo Colleoni, it was later bequeathed to the Martinengo Colleoni family and, when the dynastic line of the family died out, to the Fathers of Peace, then permanent owners of the palace.

The building, which has been modified several times, is nevertheless one of the best examples of fifteenth-century residential architecture in the city; it also houses the largest and most important cycle of wooden ceiling paintings in the Brescia area.

== History ==
=== The portion of land north of the old moat ===
The conditions under which Bartolomeo Colleoni came into possession of land in Brescia, and had a private residence built there, are actually unknown and unclear. However, a fact that is certain and also reported by contemporary sources is that the Bergamasque condottiere received in the city, from the Republic of Venice, "the portion of land north of the old moat (today's Via Pace), included between the districts coming from Porta Palata to the north (Corso Garibaldi), and Porta S. Agata to the south (Via Cairoli)." Bortolo Belotti, Colleoni's biographer, speculates in his work that the Bergamasque had come into possession, at that time, of land consisting of old hovels and gardens, on which the mansion of the condottiero would later be built; In fact, the buildings of that period had become obsolete due to the expansion of the new city walls, which had rendered the inner gate of San Giovanni, at the level of the Pallata Tower, inoperative.

The scholar Fausto Lechi, on the other hand, has theorized that the cession of this plot of land could perhaps be ascribed to 1455, given that in 1467 work on the rebuilding and arrangement of the walls was begun. In these twelve years, from 1455 to 1467, it is possible that Colleoni's palace was built, even if there are no written documents to confirm it. This version, in any case, would also concur with the testimony provided by the chronicler and historian Marin Sanudo, who reports that by 1483 the work on the city fortifications had already been completed.

=== The completed palace ===
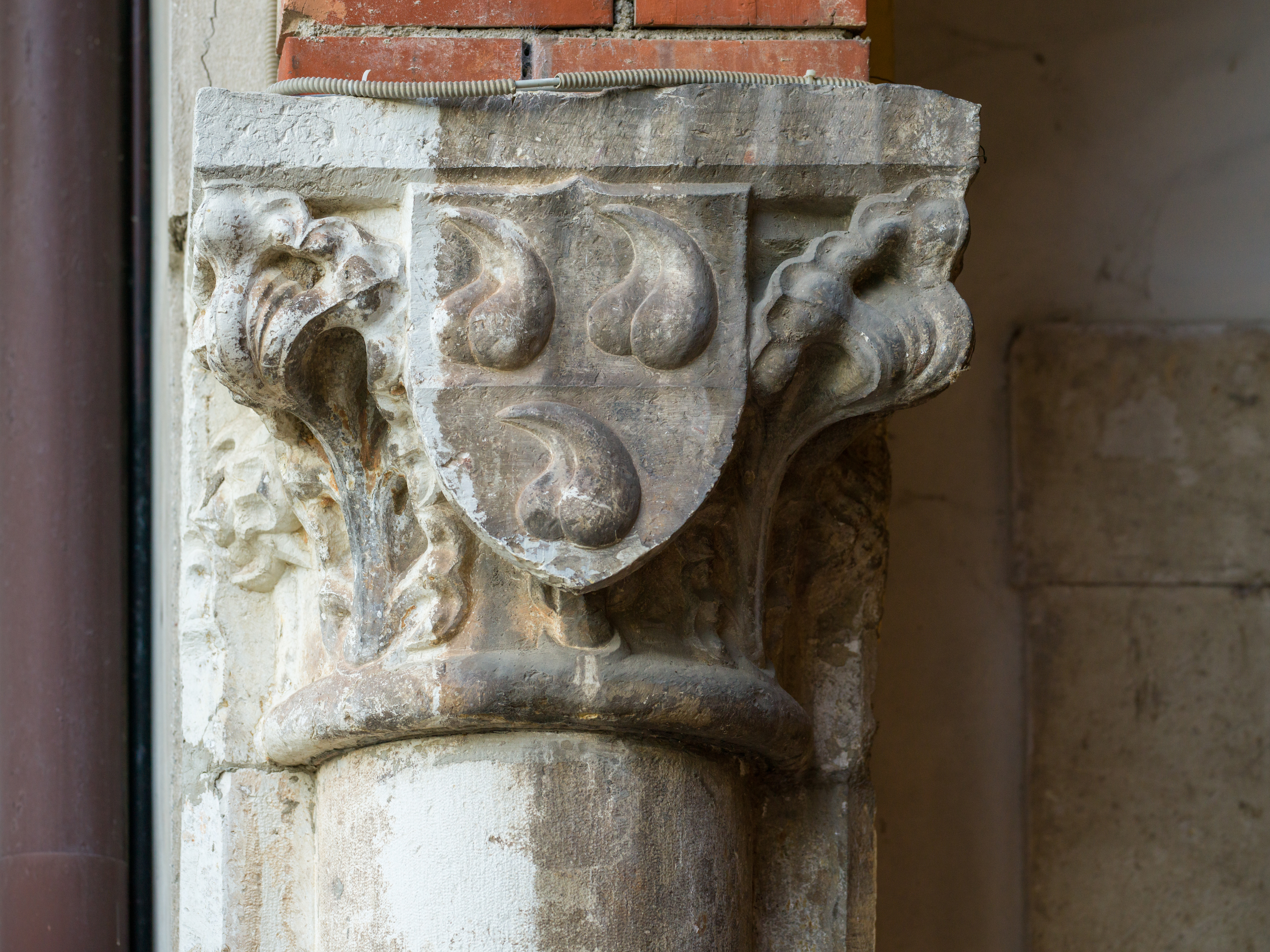
In detail, a capital from the outer courtyard of the palace, depicting the coat of arms of the Colleoni family

Three different sources testify, in turn, that the construction of the palace was started only from 1455 onward, and not in 1450 as previously believed. One of them is a public deed in which Colleoni appears as a guest and resident, along with nine other captains of fortune employed by the Serenissima, in the city of Brescia, from Holy Week until April 3, 1450; further evidence is a letter written by the Bergamasque condottiere dated November 7, 1454, precisely addressed to the Republic of Venice complaining about the lack of adequate accommodation in the city, also requesting on the same occasion honors and a substantial salary. The third and last source in this regard is a request made by Colleoni to the then members of the city council: at the dawn of 1456, In fact, he requested that the fountain of his new Brescian residence be supplied with water; this last fact undoubtedly suggests that at the time work on the construction of the palace had already begun, and indeed was well under way.

An early mention in which the building appears to have been completed, however, is the so-called Chronicle of Cristoforo da Soldo, in which the Brescian residence of the “Captain of the land” (i.e., Colleoni's designation as captain-general of the mainland is alluded to) is described in 1465 as the “Palazzo Grande,” whereas the general's other properties, namely Malpaga, Cavernago, Cologno, Urgnano, and Romano, are instead called “castles.” Other testimony worthy of consideration is the will drawn up by the condottiero on October 27, 1475, in which he bequeathed the mansion to his daughter Caterina, later the wife of the Brescian condottiere Gaspare Martinengo; the union of the two, moreover, would later give rise to the so-called collateral branch of the Martinengo della Pallata. Again according to Colleoni's wishes, should the family branch to which the palace had been left become extinct, it would be entrusted to the Ospedale della Pietà of Bergamo, which actually occurred in 1681: when the aforementioned Martinengo branch became extinct, the building was taken over by the aforementioned hospital, which in turn sold it in 1683 to the fathers of the Oratory of Saint Philip Neri, who have been in possession of the property ever since.

=== The palace over the centuries ===
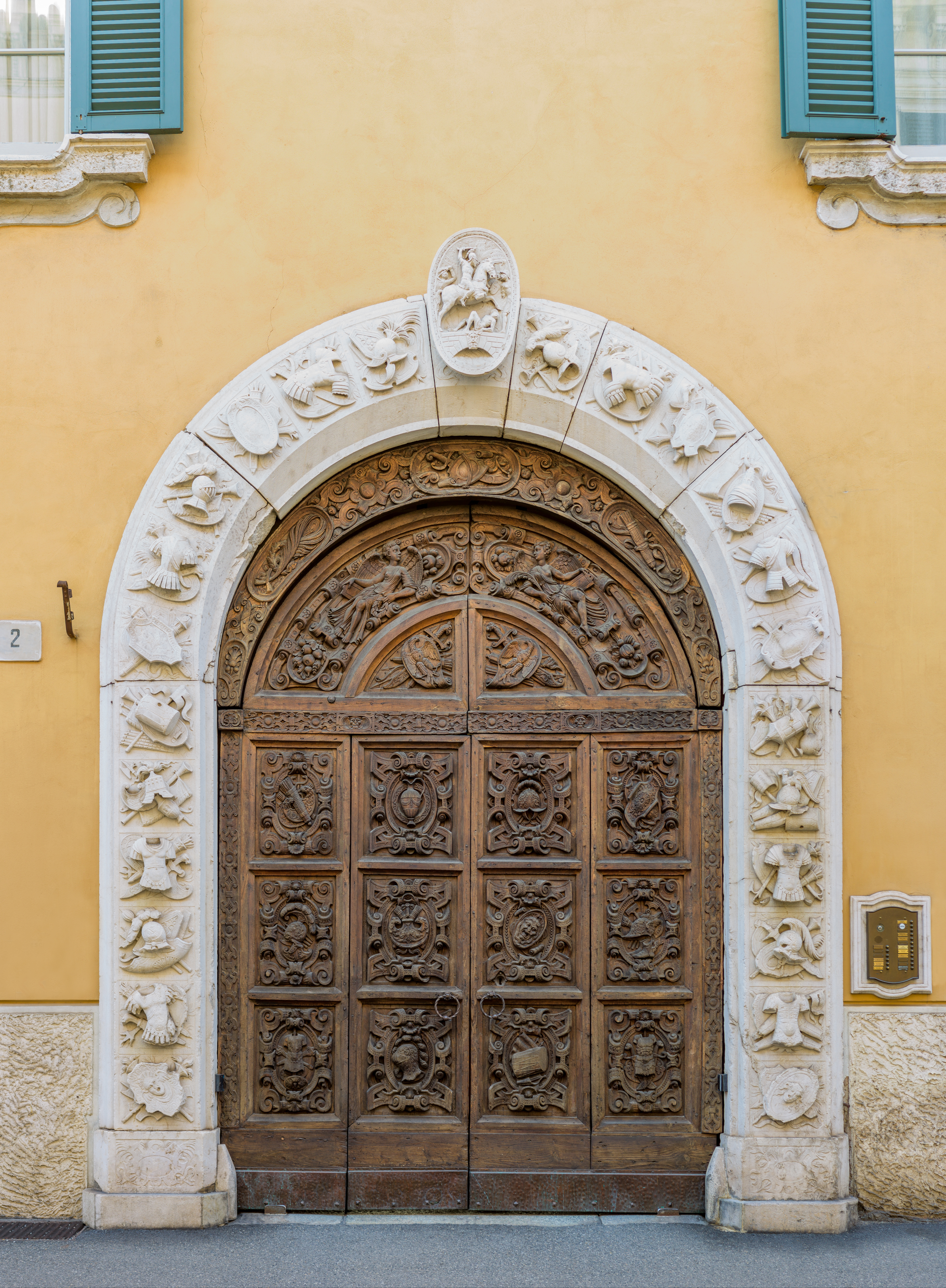
The entrance portal of the Martinengo della Motella palace, originally used in the Colleoni palace.

The aristocratic palace, just a few years after Colleoni's death, is also mentioned by Marin Sanudo in his Itinerari per la terraferma veneziana: among other things, the building is the only one openly praised by the chronicler, on a visit to Brescia, and is precisely described as a "magnificent mansion" and a "very beautiful palace". Again, some three generations later, the poet and writer Pietro Spino, a biographer of the Bergamasque condottiero, describes the palace in 1569 as a "great and noble palace". At the dawn of the 17th century, it was considered to be the only “gentleman's palace” in the city by the English visitor Thomas Coryat, who reported it as an example of “great magnificence” and therefore worthy of a visit. By the turn of the 19th century, however, the noble palace and its commissioner seem to have been completely forgotten by guidebooks and texts, including local ones, perhaps due in part to its exterior architectural structure, which at the time was much remodeled and downsized from the original 15th-century building.

As evidence of this, there are two representations of the building in the ancient maps of the city, which testify precisely to the significant changes of the palace: the primary source of these two representations is a drawing of the façade of the palace dating back to the 17th century, that is, to the time when the Fathers of Peace took possession of the building. (Note: This representation was first published in: Guerrini, Paolo (1933). La congregazione dei padri della Pace. Brescia: Scuola Tip. Opera Pavoniana. pp. 200–12.) The old drawing shows that the external façade was originally much wider than the present one, which was in fact shortened when the church of Santa Maria della Pace was built in the 18th century and when a theater was built in the 19th century. In addition, the great entrance portal to the palace, embellished with a marble decoration in the 16th century, was placed a little further south than the center of the same façade; the same portal, originally placed precisely at the entrance to the Colleoni palace, was instead removed and brought as a dowry by the noblewoman Isotta Martinengo Colleoni for her marriage to Count Gaspare Calini at the beginning of the 17th century, and then used as the entrance to the Martinengo della Motella palace. (Note: For a better understanding of the facts about the portal, see: Joost-Gaugier (1988, p. 71, nota 40))

== Description ==
=== General layout ===
The courtyard of the palace, reduced and modified from the original building. In the background, the dome of the church of Santa Maria della Pace.

Thanks to the already mentioned 17th-century depiction of the palace by the Fathers of Peace, it is possible to reconstruct, at least roughly, the original planimetric and volumetric layout of the Colleoni palace. It originally consisted of a ground floor and two upper floors, each with a horizontal series of windows surmounted by a cornice running along the entire length of the façade in question; of absolute importance, in the context of the courtyard, is the colonnade with five pointed arches, accessed through an entrance hall. The overall effect and overview of the aforementioned courtyard, which was irreparably damaged in later centuries with respect to its original structure, was to be further enhanced by a decorative apparatus made up of numerous frescoes, of which fragments and partial details are still visible. In any case, no other palace or civic building in fifteenth-century Brescia could boast the size and overall opulence of the Colleoni palace. Among the outbuildings of the palace were also large stables for horses, various lodgings, a vast library, and a private chapel.

However, the most important room of the palace must have been the Great Hall, which alone occupied most of the second floor in the eastern wing of the building: it could be accessed by a staircase located at the southern end of the portico, and in all probability it first led to a smaller Hall of Honor. In this sense, it is only possible to speculate, since the construction of the aforementioned theater in the mid-19th century disturbed the layout of this part of the palace: the aforementioned staircase has indeed been lost, as well as at least two bays of the inner loggia and the smaller Hall of Honor, as also reported by Lechi in his work. A hint of the magnificence of the great hall is contained in Da Soldo's chronicle: he reports that in 1465 it bore numerous tapestries and frescoes, as well as a roof of seven horizontal beams, each supporting an imposing chandelier. In any case, the testimony cited above does not mention any pictorial decoration in the wooden coffers of the hall; this would mean that the great decorative cycle of wooden panels contained in the Great Hall was apparently still to be made at that time.

=== The frescoed wooden panels ===
The ceilings of the stately palace, as already mentioned, are the greatest example of pictorial decoration on wooden panels in the entire province; although the attention of critics has generally been focused only on the Salone Bevilacqua, that is, the Hall of Honor, even the portico of the second floor is composed of a considerable number of decorated wooden panels and of a certain quality of execution. The scholar Fausto Lechi highlights the characteristics of the wooden ceiling of the portico, consisting of "large corbels and dark wooden beams". Similarly to what was expressed in the studies carried out by Carissimo Ruggeri, he adds that:

the ceiling of the loggia is even more precious, because its beams are accompanied by painted panels, a little too small in format, but very fine, on which human figures, animals or flowers alternate with the Colleoni coat of arms.

— Lechi, ibidem

==== The Salone Bevilacqua, or “Hall of Honor” ====
The great hall of the palace, named after Giulio Bevilacqua, consists of large beams that Lechi describes as very elaborate and that:

also contained panels, 17 on each side, recently restored [1955], as they had been covered with monochrome friezes. They are of very good workmanship and seem to represent illustrious figures, mostly warriors, divided into groups.

— Lechi, ibidem

The decorative apparatus of the wooden panels, as well as their order, has remained unchanged over time, and they make up a total of 306 panels, arranged respectively between the great Hall of Honor and the smaller room in front of it, which was later removed for the construction of the nineteenth-century theater. The subjects depicted on these small wooden panels are illustrious figures from Greek and Roman mythology, representing famous heroes, queens, and rulers of antiquity; their high social position and prestige can be inferred not only from the sumptuous robes in which they are portrayed, but also, in some cases, from clearly legible titles. Another striking feature of the great decoration of the hall is the large number of women on the aforementioned wooden panels, such as Hecuba, Andromache, Penthesilea, Cassandra, Helen, Poppaea, Lucretia, and others. Nevertheless, in the iconographic choice of female subjects, there is a certain preference for Thisbe, at least in three different representations, precisely to celebrate the wife of the Bergamasque condottiero, Tisbe Martinengo, who had the same name.

However, the panels in the hall have more or less the same dimensions, and yet, from a stylistic point of view, they represent important innovations compared to other fifteenth-century wooden ceilings; in this sense, the desire to create a context in which the viewing of the panels is organized in a single, organic and coherent compositional scheme is evident. Together with the inscriptions that clarify the identity of the subjects represented, there is a clear design of the iconographic apparatus as a whole in the light of a new sensibility, far from the previous Gothic tradition. The influence of Leon Battista Alberti's principles in his treatise De pictura, as well as the art of Bonifacio Bembo, on this stylistic apparatus is evident; in any case, the execution of the wooden panels of the Great Hall can be dated between the 1460s and the early 1470s, certainly before 1475, the year of Colleoni's death. The panels are an important testimony, both in Brescia and elsewhere, of the new humanist sensibility that was emerging at the time, in this case in the visual arts and in the civic sphere, as precisely in the residence of Colleoni, who wanted to present himself not only as a condottiere and captain of fortune, but also as a patron and man of culture. This particular variation of civic art in a classical and ancient style was probably conceived and organized by an intellectual at the service of the condottiero, such as Antonio Cornazzano, who lived in Colleoni's residence until his death in 1475.

== See also ==
- Bartolomeo Colleoni

== Bibliography ==
Ancient sources

- Spino, Pietro (1569). Historia della vita, et fatti dell'eccellentissimo capitano di guerra Bartolomeo Coglione scritta per m. Pietro Spino. Venezia: Grazioso Percacino.
- Da Soldo, Cristoforo (1938). La Cronaca di Cristoforo da Soldo. Bologna: N. Zanichelli.
- Sanudo, Marino (1847). Itinerario di Marin Sanuto per la terraferma veneziana nell'anno 1483. Padova: Tip. del seminario.

Modern sources

- Bonfadini, Paola (2005). Palazzo Colleoni (PDF). Brescia: Starrylink editrice. pp. 43–49. ISBN 88-89720-19-0.
- Joost-Gaugier, Christiane L. (1988). "Bartolomeo Colleoni as a Patron of art and architecture: the Palazzo Colleoni in Brescia". Arte Lombarda (84-85 (1-2)). Vita e Pensiero: 61–72. ISSN 0004-3443. JSTOR 43130226.
- Fappani, Antonio (1991), "MARTINENGO della PALLATA", MARTINENGO della PALLATA - Enciclopedia Bresciana, Enciclopedia bresciana, vol. 8, Brescia: La Voce del Popolo, OCLC 163182000
- Ruggeri, Carissimo (1995). "I Padri della Pace nel secolo dei lumi". La chiesa di Santa Maria della Pace in Brescia. Brescia: La Scuola. pp. 13–40. ISBN 88-350-9081-4.
- Fappani, Antonio (1974), "COLLEONI Bartolomeo", COLLEONI Bartolomeo - Enciclopedia Bresciana, Enciclopedia bresciana, vol. 2, Brescia: La Voce del Popolo, OCLC 163181903
- Fè d'Ostiani, Luigi Francesco (1927). Storia, tradizione e arte nelle vie di Brescia. Brescia: Figli di Maria Immacolata.
- Peroni, Adriano (1963). L'architettura e la scultura nei secoli XV e XVI. Vol. II. Brescia: Morcelliana.
- Guerrini, Paolo (1930). Una celebre famiglia lombarda: i conti di Martinengo: studi e ricerche genealogiche. Brescia: Tipo-litografia F.lli Geroldi.
- Lechi, Fausto (1974). 2: Il Quattrocento. Vol. III. Brescia: Edizioni di Storia bresciana. pp. 236–245.
