= Battle of Molinella =

1467 battle between the republics of Venice and Florence

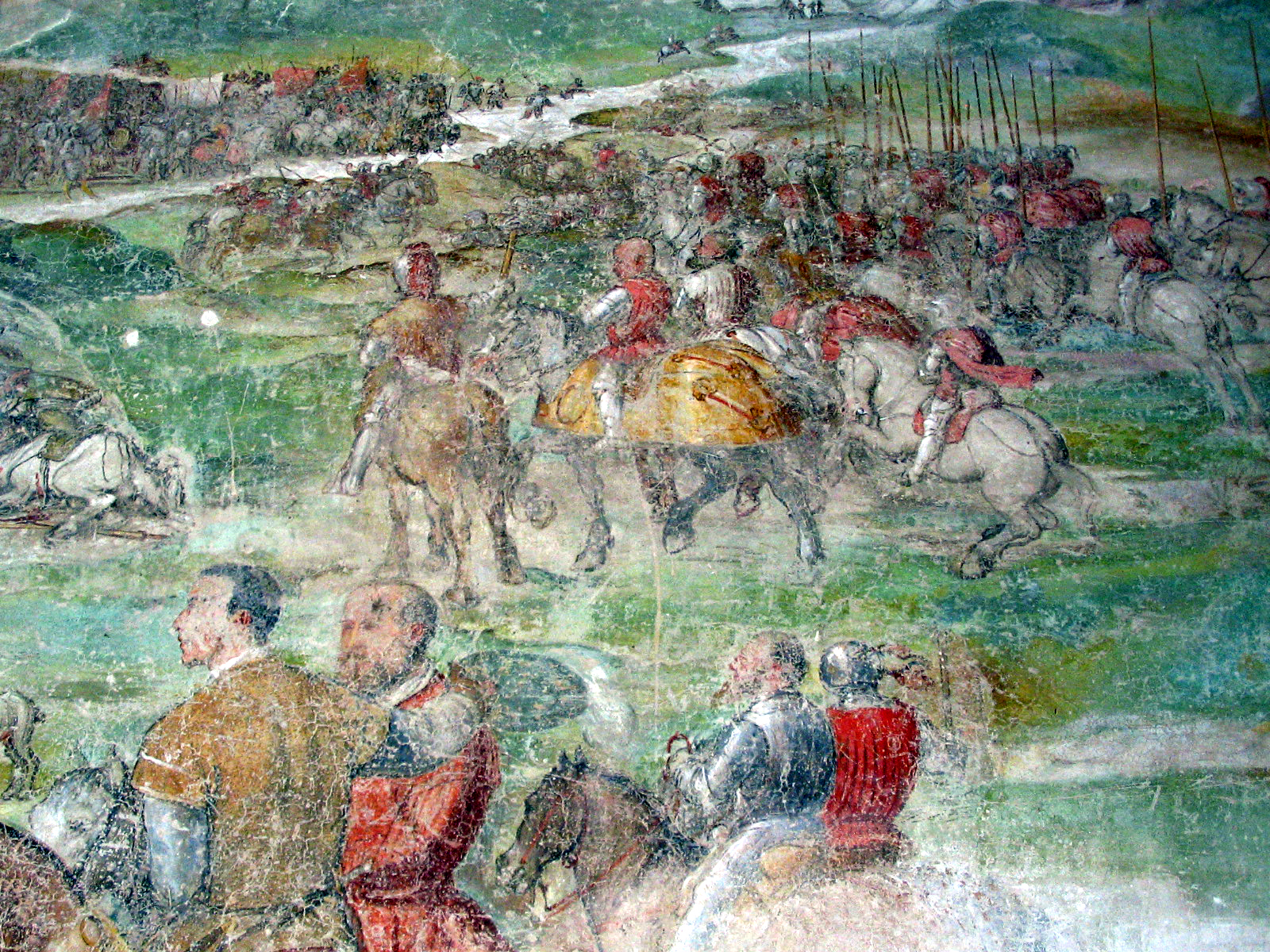
- Depiction of the battle in the Malpaga Castle
Date	July 25, 1467
Location	Molinella, Province of Bologna
Result	Indecisive

Belligerents
Republic of Venice	Republic of Florence

Commanders and leaders
Bartolomeo Colleoni	Piero di Cosimo de' Medici, Federico da Montefeltro

Strength
14,000	13,000

Casualties and losses
- 500 killed 500–1,000 wounded 1,000 horses killed "ripped up"

The Battle of Riccardina or Battle of Molinella, fought on July 25, 1467, in Molinella, was one of the most important battles of the 15th century in Italy.

== Combatants ==
- On the one side were 14,000 infantry and cavalry led by Bartolomeo Colleoni fighting for Venice (but Colleoni had his personal agenda), in coalition with Borso d'Este, Marquis of Ferrara (represented by his half-brother Ercole I d'Este) and the Lords of Pesaro, Forlì, and some renegade families of Florence.
- On the other side was an army of 13,000 soldiers in the service of Florence, allied with Galeazzo Maria Sforza (ruler of the Duchy of Milan), King Ferdinand II of Aragon and Giovanni II Bentivoglio (ruler of Bologna). The army was led by Federico da Montefeltro.

== Battle ==
The battle was fought along the Idice river, between the villages of Riccardina (near Budrio) and Molinella. Historians disagree on who won the battle. The only certainty is that Bartolomeo Colleoni had to abandon his plans to conquer Milan. There were between 600 and 700 casualties. Notable was the large number of horses killed (almost 1,000). Artillery and firearms were intensively used for the first time in Italy in this battle.

A large fresco in the Castle of Malpaga, probably by Girolamo Romani, depicts the battle.

In 1468 peace was concluded under the initiative of Pope Paul II.
