= Cappella Colleoni =

Chapel and mausoleum in Bergamo, Italy

Colleoni Chapel
- Cappella Colleoni
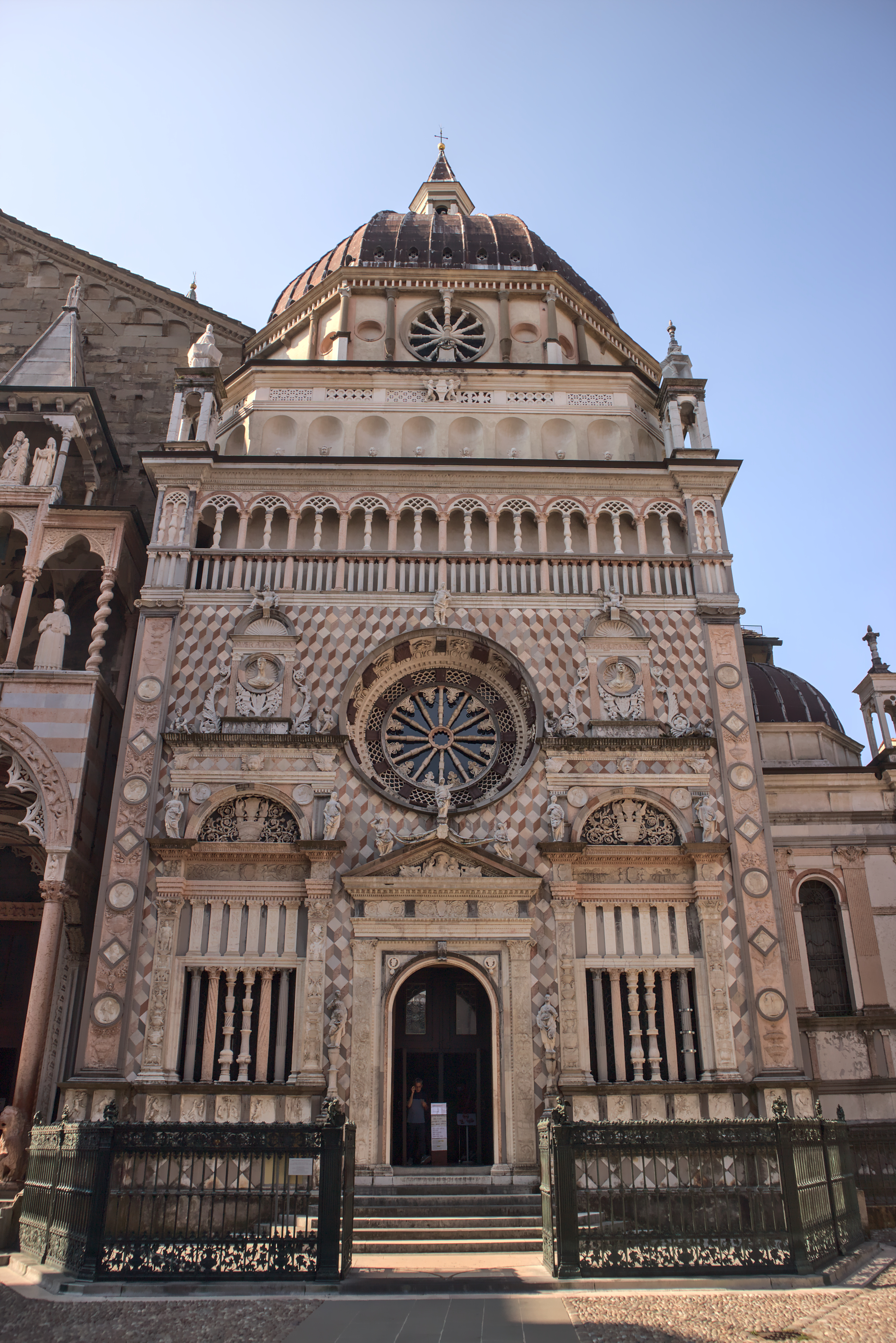
- Façade of the Colleoni chapel
- Colleoni Chapel
- Location: Bergamo, Lombardy
- Address: Piazza Duomo
- Country: Italy
- Denomination: Catholic
- Website: Cappella Colleoni

History
- Founder: Bartolomeo Colleoni
- Consecrated: 1455

Architecture
- Architect: Giovanni Antonio Amadeo
- Style: Renaissance architecture
- Groundbreaking: 1472
- Completed: 1476

Administration
- Diocese: Roman Catholic Diocese of Bergamo

The Colleoni Chapel (Italian: Cappella Colleoni) is a Renaissance funerary chapel built in 1476 at the behest of Bartolomeo Colleoni as his mausoleum, designed by Giovanni Antonio Amadeo and dedicated to St. John the Baptist. It is located in the square of the Bergamo Cathedral, next to the Basilica of Santa Maria Maggiore.

== History ==
Commissioned by Bartolomeo Colleoni as his own mausoleum, sepulcrum sibi vivus extruxsit [...] pro patrie munificenzia et imperii maiestate, dedicated to Saints Bartholomew, Mark and John the Baptist, it was built between 1470 and 1476 but not completely finished, as some works were added later. The construction was initially supervised by the condottiero's friend, the architect Alessio Agliardi, who, as a member of the Confraternity of Misericordia Maggiore, kept in touch with the interested parties to obtain the various authorizations, both ecclesiastical and municipal, necessary for the construction.

There has been some debate about these dates, especially the year in which construction began: some say 1470, others, like Belotti, 1472. Both dates can be accepted if one gives credence to the 17th century writer Donato Calvi who in 1676 wrote that on June 1, 1470 [...] the foundations were laid today of the Chapel or Oratory adjacent to Santa Maria Maggiore, built by the famous captain Bartolomeo in his perpetual memory, where his glorious Sepulcher was later erected. However, all the notarial documentation consulted attests that no work had been undertaken until 1472. On March 6, 1470, the favorite daughter of the condottiero, Medea, had died, and this could have given a greater motivation and a push to the realization of the mausoleum, which would suggest that Calvi could have given a date, if not possible, certainly desired and motivated by Colleoni.

The actual construction of the monumental complex began, however, in 1472 with the demolition of the sacristy of Santa Maria Maggiore and the portico in front of it. The existence of this sacristy at the beginning of 1472 is proven by a plea from the rectors of the church to Colleoni that eum rogabant ne destrueret.

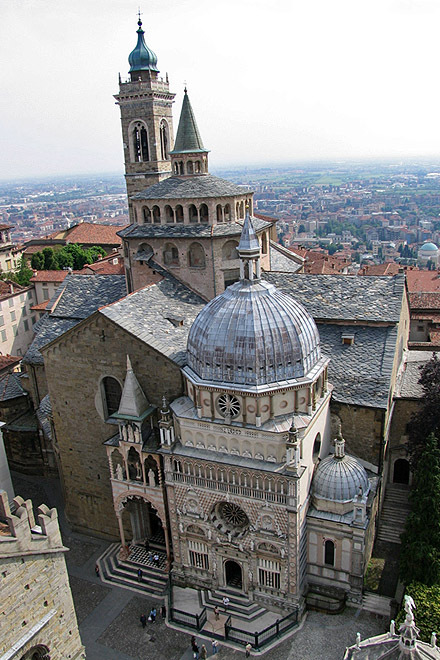
Colleoni Chapel

=== Manu militari ===
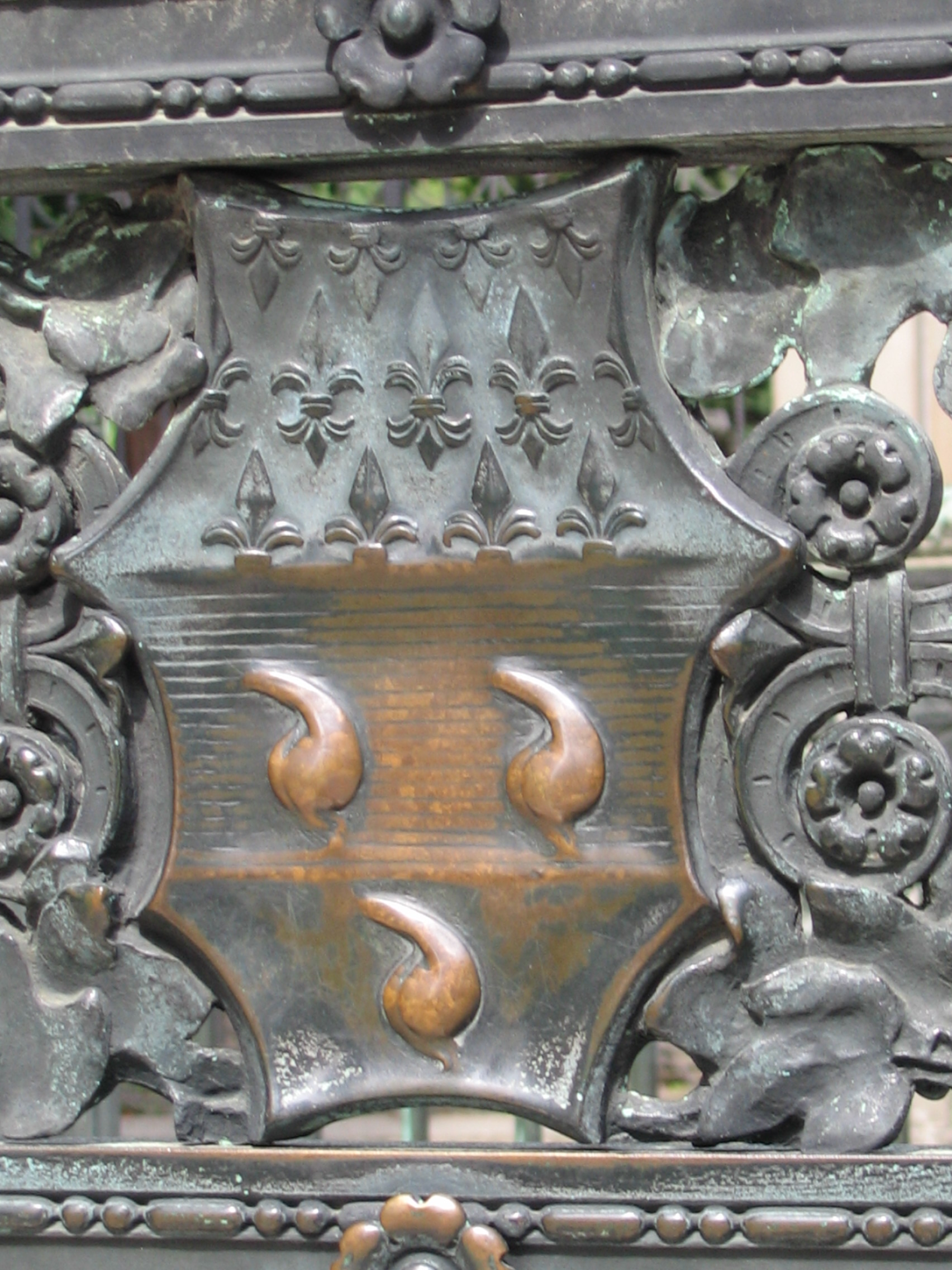
Coat of arms of the Colleoni family in use since at least 1123 - Three testicles

The land where the chapel was built was originally used for three purposes: there was a small chapel, the cimerchium, closed by a gate, which was the place where the valuable liturgical furnishings were kept that were not used in ordinary ceremonies, but only for important occasions; it was therefore not the sacristy for daily use, being also far from the presbytery but a safe place, while a part of the land was free municipal land.
The demolition of the sacristy of Santa Maria Maggiore to make room for the mausoleum raised the question of whether it was an act of arrogance on the part of Colleoni, tired of the bureaucratic delays that were holding up the start of the work, or whether it was done with the agreement of the church administrators. Colleoni had asked for authorization from the municipal administration to build the mausoleum in a location that was not clearly identified, given the various changes that the church and the buildings surrounding it had undergone over time. Perhaps it was the Palazzo della Ragione itself that was to be demolished, in urgent need of restoration, which was carried out in the early years of the sixteenth century to a design by Pietro Isabello. However, this remains an assumption, considering that the condottiero wanted the mausoleum to be the focal point of the square.

The reading of the accounting ledger of the new sacristy where it says that the previous one had been ruinata ac accepta per Illustrem condam Bertolomeum colionum gave rise to what Monsignor Angelo Meli, one of the leading scholars of the chapel, defines as the legend of armed intervention. The term “ruinata” was understood to be the consequence of violent action by the military power, while it was intended to express only the physical fact of the demolition itself, without implying that it was the result of force.

In support of the agreed demolition is the statement of Vanoto Colombi, a loyal follower of the captain general, who on April 4, 1483, testified that the sacristy

destructa fuit et ruinata de consensu tamen presidentium et gubernantium ipsam eclesiam
was destroyed and demolished with the consent of the rectors and administrators of the church itself

However, Colombi's affection and loyalty towards the Captain make his version of events suspect. The date 1472 is supported by the statements of Alessio Agliardi, who declares on the document evaluating the damage and the consequent compensation that he was a member of the MIA Foundation, which was active in the period from February 1472 to March 1473.

The reconstruction of the documents by Meli leaves no room for doubt. However, while legends survive, the truth is obscured by time. What is certain is that Colleoni's power and charisma were such that he could have imposed his will without the intervention of soldiers. Colleoni had promised to rebuild the sacristy in its new location, but at his death in 1483, the promise had not yet been kept, and in that very year the Congregation of the Misericordia Maggiore sent a request to the Republic of Venice to ensure that the promises were kept. In conclusion, it certainly cannot be denied that the first stone could have been laid in 1470, for a building perhaps of smaller dimensions, as indicated by Calvi, and that the sacristy remained until 1472, because the condottiero did not want the cimerchium to be destroyed immediately, also serving as a chapel for services, and was only demolished in 1472.

The doubt, unfounded, would persist but it is of little importance when compared to the splendor of the mausoleum that Bartolomeo Colleoni, even though he wanted it for himself, left to his city, enriching its artistic heritage with a work of universal beauty.

The final date of completion of the work is considered to be 1476, also in consideration of the fact that Amadeo was working on the Certosa di Pavia in 1474, something he would not have been allowed to do if the chapel had not already been completed, and that in 1475 he asked for the rest of his payment. However, the observation of some construction details and some notarial documents testify that even at the beginning of the sixteenth century, work was still being done on the arrangement of details of the façade and the cornices.

=== The mystery of Colleoni's remains ===
For centuries it was believed that the body of Bartolomeo Colleoni was not in the mausoleum but in some other place, as the sarcophagi were found to be empty at every inspection, giving rise to an intense historical mystery about the fate of the condottiere's remains.

There was even a legend that the coffin was moved from the ark to another place, perhaps under the floor of Santa Maria Maggiore, by order of St. Charles Borromeo, based on the real fact that after an apostolic visit of the Cardinal, in 1575, some relics were actually removed from the chapel.

[...] vexilla appensa tollantur intra triduum, nec ullo modo restituantur.
[...] the hanging banners are to be removed within three days and will not be replaced.

—

The legend is not supported by any mention in the acts of the pastoral visit, and it is inconceivable that this omission was deliberate or accidental, especially in view of the ecclesiastical reform that Borromeo was carrying out with strength and determination: such an important move, especially felt by the community of Bergamo, could not have been made without a formal provision. On the other hand, the Cardinal kept Medea's coffin in her tomb in the church of Santa Maria di Basella in Urgnano, and to have done otherwise with respect to that of his father Bartolomeo would have been contradictory and incomprehensible. It is probable that the rumor spread because of the need to give a rational explanation for the disappearance of Colleoni's remains.

The solution of the mystery seemed to come on January 14, 1950, with the reopening of a massive stone coffin found on July 11, 1651 under the floor of Santa Maria Maggiore, containing several bones of very high stature and size, and with the bones a wooden stick and a sword. The commission present at the exhumation hastily declared that the bones belonged to Colleoni, without pointing out the obvious contradictions. The following facts were not explained: the use of an early medieval ark; the absence of any inscription on the coffin; the presence of a wooden sword instead of a real one; the height of the skeleton, which did not correspond to the stature that Colleoni was said to have had. The doubts, which were never allayed, led to a re-examination of the remains by a commission appointed by the Ministry of Education, chaired by Father Agostino Gemelli, who on May 21, 1956 ruled out that the bones in question belonged to Colleoni: a story ended, but the mystery remained, and in fact the mystery of the true origin of the bones also arose. Perhaps they belonged to a medieval warrior, while the origin of the wooden sword remained unexplained.

==== The solution ====
Interest in the fate of Colleoni's remains had diminished over the centuries, despite sporadic inspections, until 1922, when, on June 15, during an official visit, Victor Emmanuel III asked those accompanying him where the condottiero's remains were, creating an uncomfortable situation because no one was able to give an answer. As he was leaving, the king advised the prior to search again, find the great condottiero and report to him. This event, particularly embarrassing and, in a certain sense, humiliating for the authoritative guests who should have given an answer, led to new research and new hypotheses, which, however, did not solve the ancient mystery, aggravated by the anonymity of the coffin contained in the sarcophagus found in the Basilica of Santa Maria Maggiore. Only Monsignor Meli insisted that Colleoni's body was inside the chapel, because that was what all the witnesses of the time said. Marin Sanudo, who described the chapel in 1483, was particularly explicit: This [chapel] was built during the lifetime of Bartholamio Coglion [...] Captain of the General Signoria of Terra; he was lord of Martinengo, Roman, Malpaga and other castles. Here his body is buried in a most splendid tomb. This report, written several years after the events, is added to other, more ambiguous, but all consistent reports of the burial inside the chapel, with no evidence to the contrary, except that the arks had been emptied. The attempts made after Victor Emmanuel III's visit were unsuccessful, but they brought the problem back to the attention of the historical-scientific community, thanks to Meli's conviction that the presence of a coffin inside the chapel, even if not proven, could not be ruled out.

In 1968 the Lerici Foundation became involved and in November 1969 sent its own technicians equipped with new magnetometric prospecting instruments. The inspection took place on November 21, 1969 and consisted of two almost simultaneous phases, one empirical and the other geophysical. The floor of the main ark was probed with a stick, which produced an unusual resonance, while the accidental fall of a piece of the covering slab produced a crack in the underlying axis through which what appeared to be bones could be glimpsed. At the same time, the geophysical survey indicated the presence of various arranged metal objects. At a quarter to two o'clock, a corrugated layer of limestone was broken through, revealing a long, flat chest underneath. The chest was opened at about four in the afternoon and the coffin of Bartolomeo Colleoni appeared, arms crossed, in a good state of preservation, wearing what a Sforza spy had described as a crimson satin coat: socks, a Turkish silver cloth, gloves, a sword and spurs, together with a staff and a cap. Everything matched except for the sword, which wasn't found immediately, but on February 5, 1970, when the coffin was cleaned: it was hidden by the body of the Captain General.

The coffin also contained a lead plaque commemorating the deceased:

BARTOLOMEUS COLIONUS
NOBILIS BERGO. PRIVILEGIO
ANDEGAVENSIS ILL.MI IMPERIJ
VENETORUM IMPERATOR
GENERALIS INVICTUS
VIXIT ANNOS LXXX
IMPERAVIT IIII ET XX
OBIIT. III. NO. NOVEMBRIS
CCCCLXXV SUPRA MILLE

Colleoni was buried in his monument on January 4, 1476, two months after his death on November 3, 1475. At that time, the monument had not yet been completed.

== Description ==
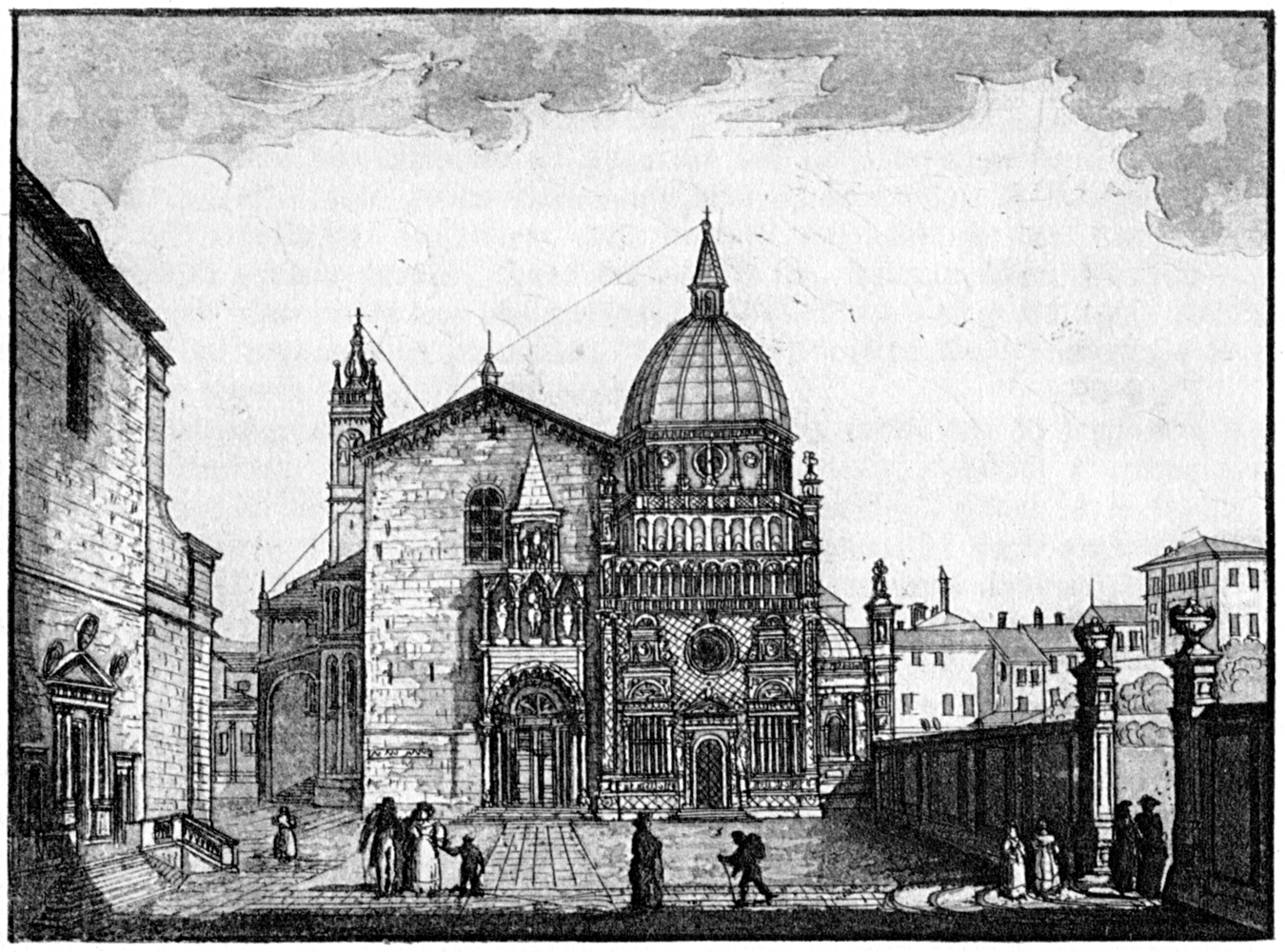
Engraving from 1843

The Colleoni Chapel, a masterpiece by Giovanni Antonio Amadeo, is the artistic jewel left by the condottiere, pro patriae munificenzia et imperii maiestate, to Bergamo, the city of which he considered himself patronus.

Amadeo adopted an architectural solution that formally harmonizes with the basilica, which it flanks, in the octagonal tambour and in the spire of the lantern. The choice of the roof and the polychromy of the marble recall the prothyrum by Giovanni da Campione, enhancing the mausoleum-like characteristics but at the same time making the building suitable for liturgical celebrations. It is the masterpiece of Giovanni Antonio Amadeo, rooted in the Middle Ages but projected into the Lombard Renaissance, completed by successive additions that allude to Baroque Mannerism. The movement of the volumes and their upward tension lighten the construction, while the sculptures, which make the façade speak with their symbolic meanings, make it an allegory of the cursus honorum of the condottiere who had commissioned it.

=== Façade ===
The façade, composed of inlays and decorations in polychrome marble with white, red and black lozenges, has a rose window above the portal, on top of which is a statue, perhaps originally made of metal, but without any attributes. It represents the condottiero as the ideal figure of a captain, but also as a Roman emperor and close to the patron saint of Bergamo, Saint Alexander of Bergamo. On either side of him are two medallions depicting Caesar and Trajan. Its geometry extends vertically, following three parallel bands, enclosed by two historiated pilasters culminating in two pinnacles joined by an elegant loggia lightened by ten biforas.

The roof is formed by an octagonal tambour, which rests on the small loggia, and by a segmented dome that ends with a lantern that houses a statue of the Madonna and Child. In the tambour there is a small rose window, aligned with the larger one below, which contains the bronze serpent of Moses, as if to emphasize a line of continuity between the biblical character and Colleoni.

The upper part of the base of the façade contains nine panels with bas-reliefs, five of which depict ten paired biblical stories: the Creation of Adam and the Creation of Eve; the Temptation and Expulsion from Eden; the Labor of Adam and Eve and the Binding of Isaac; the Offerings to God of Cain and Abel and the Killing of Abel; the Hunter Lamech and the Death of Cain; and four bas-reliefs depicting the life of Hercules: Hercules and Antaeus, Hercules and the Lernaean Hydra, Hercules and the Cretan Bull, Hercules and the Nemean Lion.

Above the pilasters of the windows on either side of the portal, decorated with floral motifs and medallions with small busts, there are four statues of the Virtues.

The wrought iron and bronze gate, bearing the Colleoni coat of arms, was made in 1912 by Virginio Muzio based on a design by Gaetano Moretti.

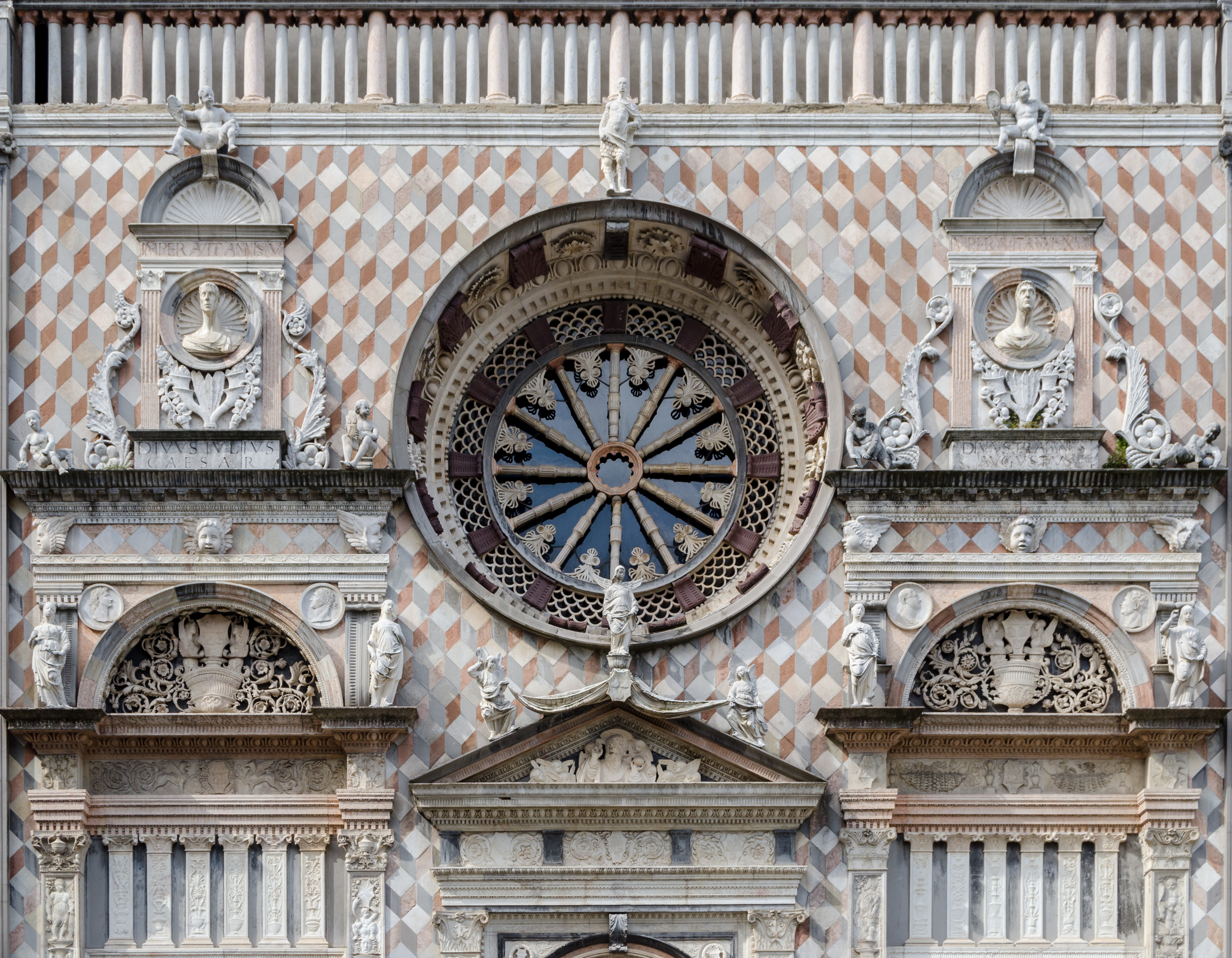
Rose window and busts of Caesar and Trajan

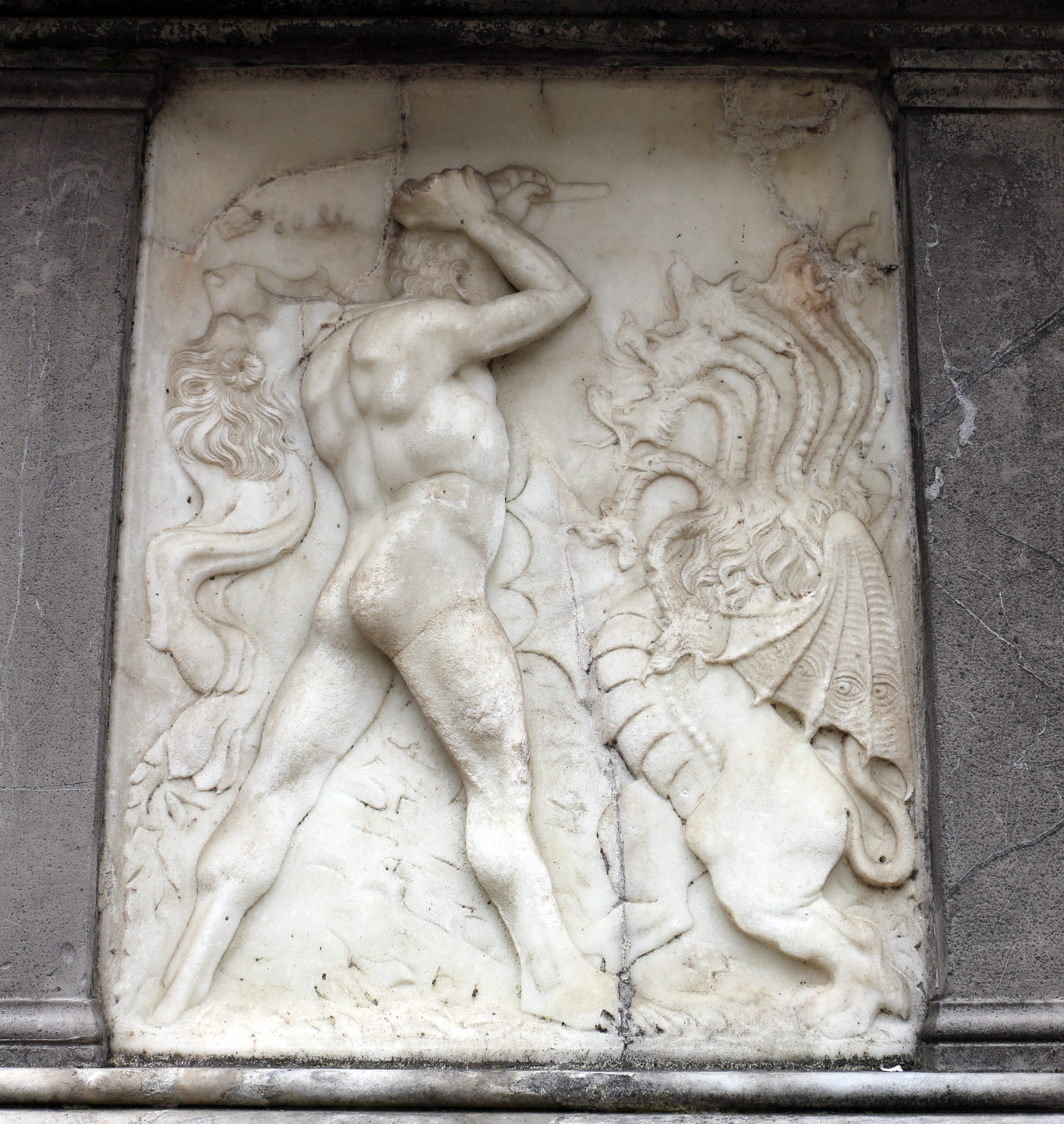
Giovanni Antonio Amadeo, Hercules and the Hydra

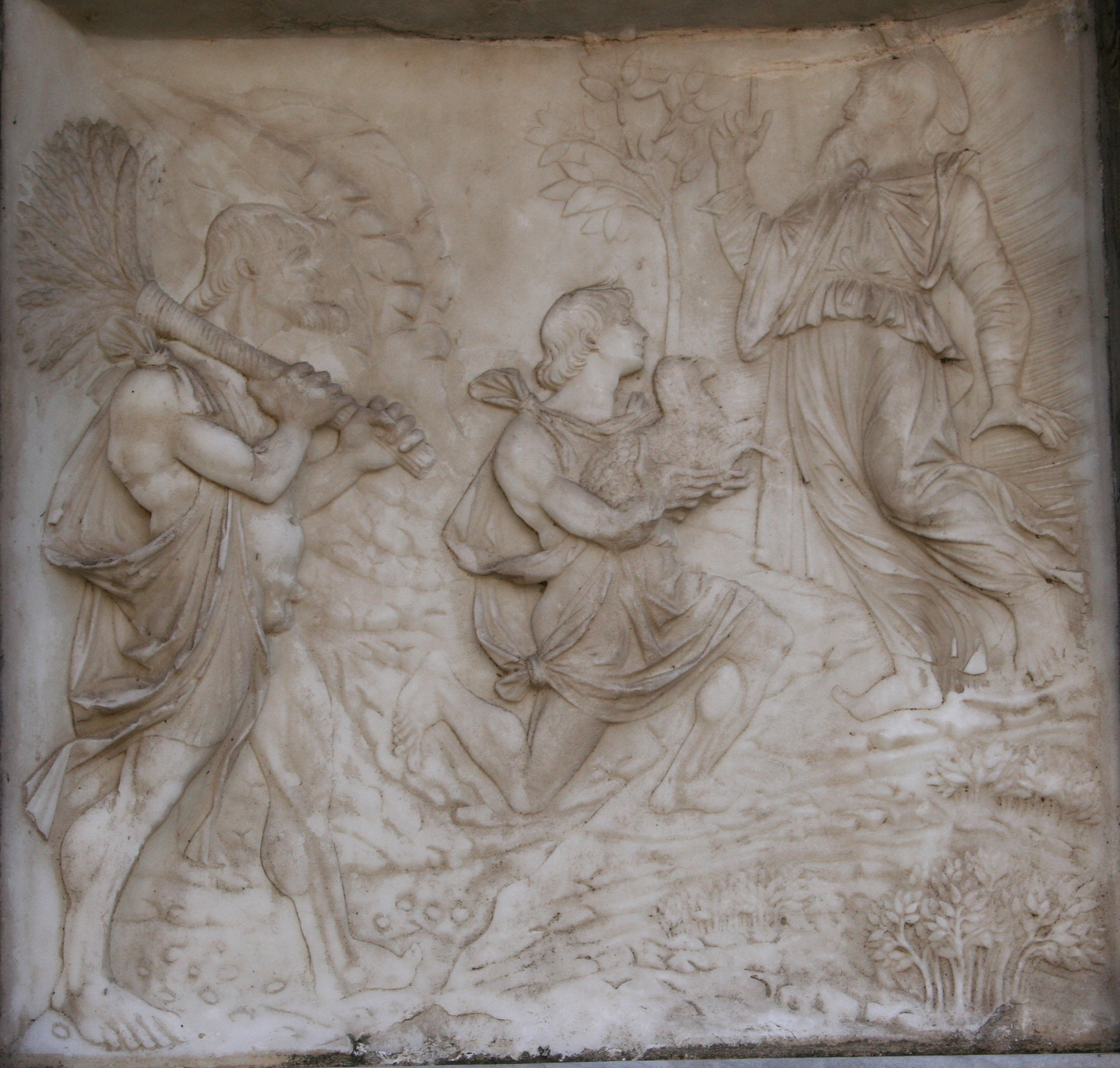
Giovanni Antonio Amadeo, Cain and Abel

=== Interior ===
The interior consists of a square room and a smaller one to the side with the presbytery.

==== Colleoni's funeral monument ====
It was built by Amadeo according to the traditional arcosolium structure, placed on the wall opposite the entrance. The pillars, which have lion heads at their base, support a first sarcophagus with bas-reliefs depicting scenes of the crucifixion of Christ; above it there is a second sarcophagus, the purpose of which is unknown, supported by three statues, also with bas-reliefs depicting the scenes of the Annunciation, the Nativity of Christ and the Adoration of the Magi.

The equestrian statue of the condottiere in gilded wood, made by Sisto and Siry of Nuremberg in 1501 at a cost of 1,600 gold ducats, replaced the stone one that was unstable due to its weight, by resolution of January 17, 1493, and is placed at the top of the pyramid structure of the monument. It is a particularly elegant and at the same time imposing work that exalts the condottiero at the height of his power. The calm and composed expression on his face contrasts sharply with the swaggering fury that emanates from Verrocchio's monument in Venice, which depicts different moments and different tensions: in Venice, Colleoni fights and builds his own fortune, while in the chapel he consciously displays the power he has achieved. The upright posture of the body, the head with the cap turned forward and the raised staff of command appear frozen, contradicted only by the horse that turns towards the spectators, also participating in a scene magnified by the blue of the background. The upper sarcophagus and the equestrian statue, flanked by the statues of Delilah and Judith resting on it, are surrounded by an arch supported by two pairs of light columns with bases in sculpted red marble, all on a turquoise background.

The lower sarcophagus, the larger one, contains the remains of Colleoni, which were found there only on November 21, 1969, after centuries of mystery. The decoration of the upper sarcophagus contrasts with the dramatic scenes depicted on it. The scenes depicted are the Ascent to Calvary, the Crucifixion and the Deposition.

The two sarcophagi are connected by three seated warriors who observe Colleoni with the statues of Samson and David on either side, in a mixture of sacred and pagan that characterizes the entire chapel.

The almost theatrical scenography is completed by the light columns on red marble bases that, with the arch above them, surround the equestrian statue on a blue background, creating a polychrome whole that is both refined and spectacular.

On the lower edge of the sarcophagus, almost like a procession or a playful carousel of naked cherubs, are the coat of arms of Colleoni, also the work of Amadeo, and made prior to the reliefs on the sarcophagus. This relief is similar to the sculptures in the small cloister of the Certosa di Pavia. The cherubs hold up two coats of arms: Colleoni's coat of arms and the coat of arms of the Anjou family, with its lilies.

The Colleoni coat of arms on the base of the main sarcophagus depicts three testicles, which were part of his name and his battle cry: Coglia, Coglia, Coglia.

==== The funeral monument of Medea ====
The tomb of Colleoni's favorite daughter, who died on March 6, 1470, also by Amadeo, is on the left wall. On the sarcophagus lies a statue of Medea, lying on her back with a serene, almost dormant expression, protected by the delicate Mother of God placed between St. Clare and St. Catherine in a visually complex scene of great sweetness. On the front, the Colleoni coat of arms reappears, almost in contrast with the gracefulness of the scene: the Colleoni testicles and the lilies of Anjou that, with the Burgundian bands, enclose the Pietà, as a constant reminder of the strength and power achieved. The sarcophagus was only moved to its current location in 1842, when it was transferred from the Madonna della Basella sanctuary in Urgnano where it had been until that date.

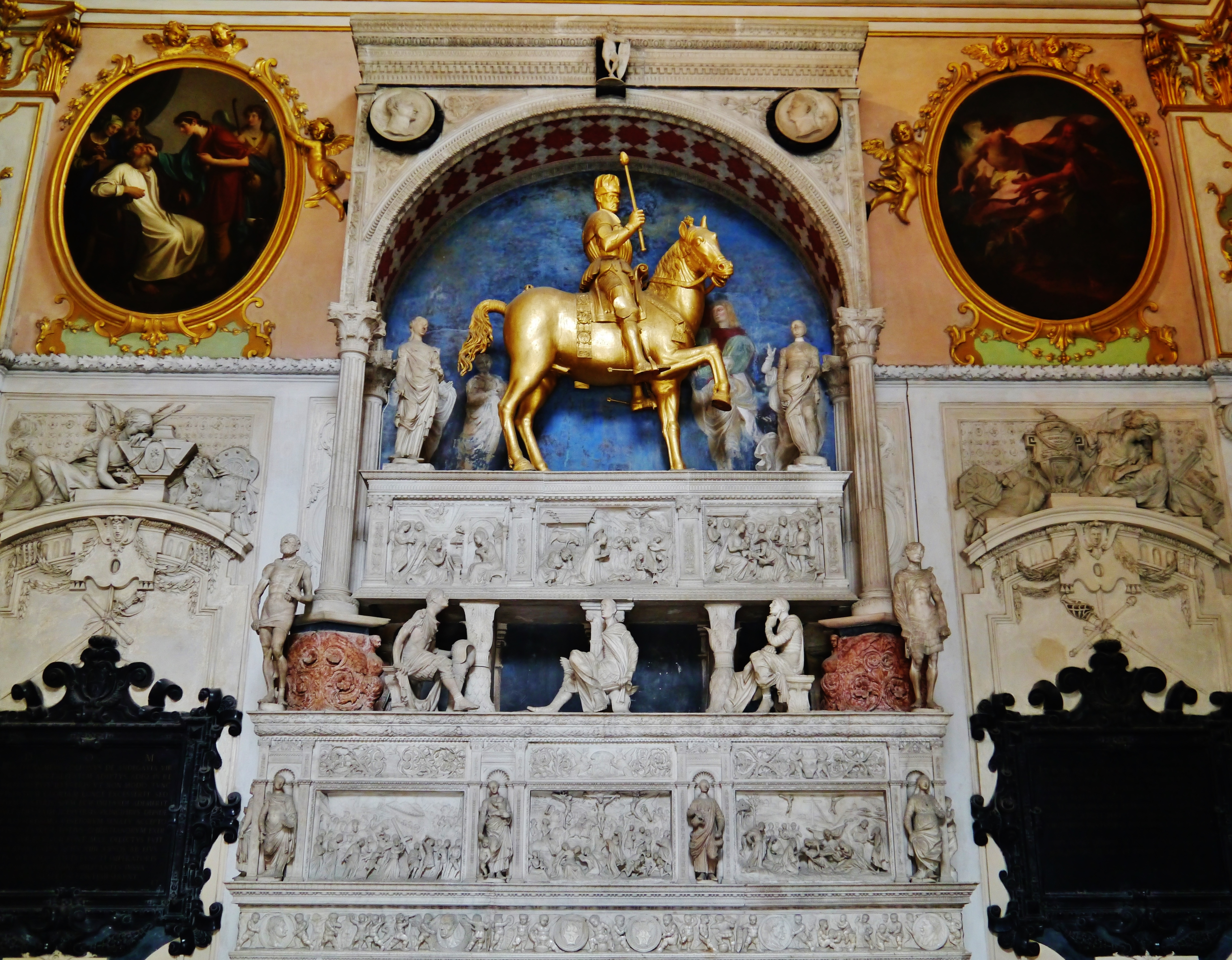
Giovanni Antonio Amadeo, Colleoni's funeral monument

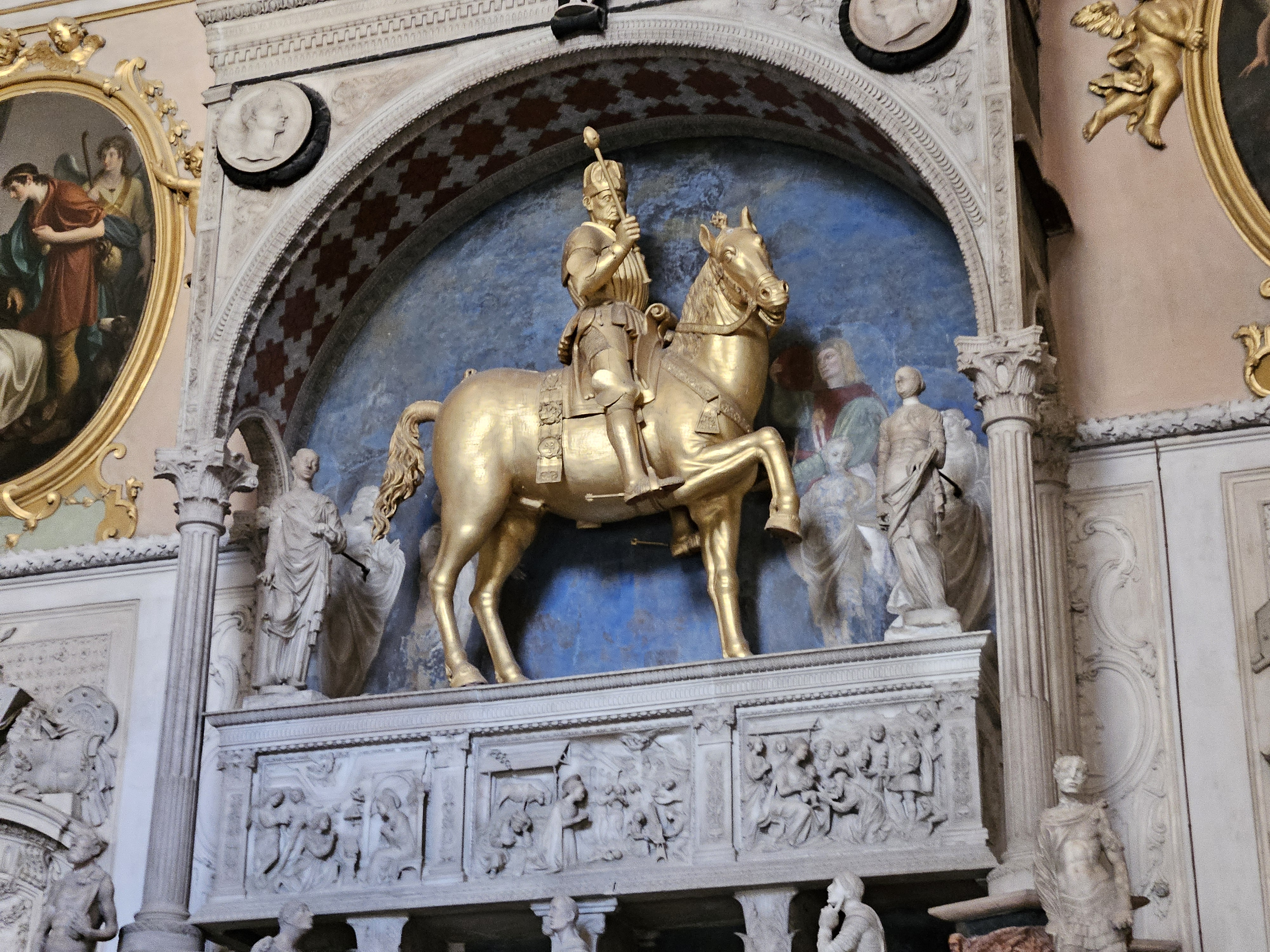
Gilded wooden equestrian statue of Bartolomeo Colleoni, Leonardo Siry and Sisto of Nuremberg, 1493

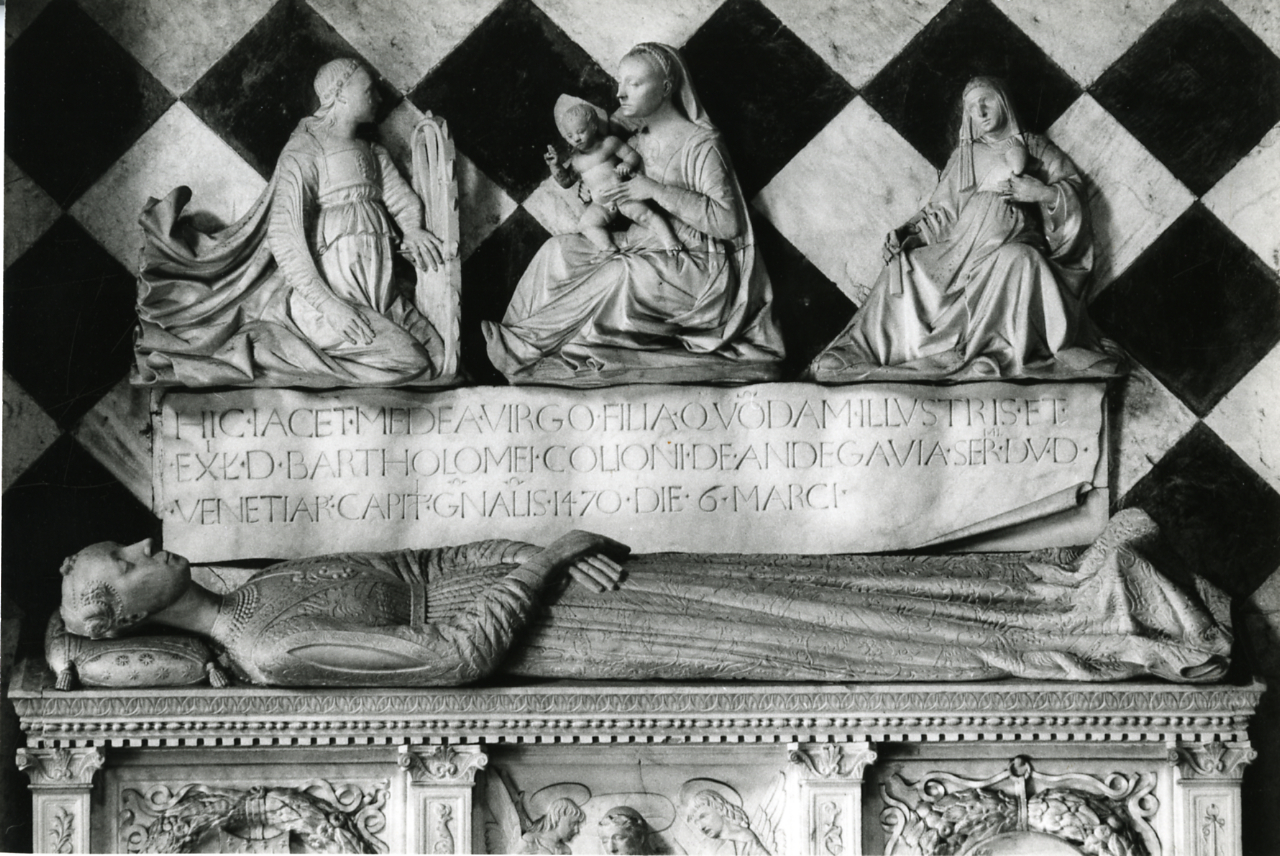
Giovanni Antonio Amadeo, reclining statue of Medea

==== Other works of art ====
Two carved and inlaid wooden benches adorn the presbytery. The inlays are the work of Giovan Battista Caniana, 1750–1790, and depict biblical scenes, while the sculptures are by Giovanni Antonio Sanz 1750–1803. Above the left bench is a painting by Angelica Kauffman, 1741–1807.

The presbytery, to which a small sacristy is annexed, has an altar in the Baroque style, the work of Bartolomeo Manni, dated 1676, with statues of St. John the Baptist, St. Bartholomew the Apostle and St. Mark the Evangelist, the work of Pietro, Tullio and Antonio Lombardo, and is enclosed by two elegant spiral columns.

The altar, designed by Leopoldo Pollack, is supported by two angels by Grazioso Rusca, 19th century. The carved pews are the work of Giovanni Antonio Sanz and the biblical inlays are also by Caniana (1773); on the wall is the painting The Holy Family with St. John the Baptist, by Angelika Maria Kauffmann, 1789.

The frescoes on the pendentives, lunettes and dome, depicting episodes from the lives of St. John the Baptist, St. Mark and St. Bartholomew, are by Giambattista Tiepolo, who painted them between 1732 and 1733, commissioned by the directors of the Luogo Pio della Pietà Bartolomeo Colleoni and with the help of Francesco Capella.

The lunettes were restored in 1996.

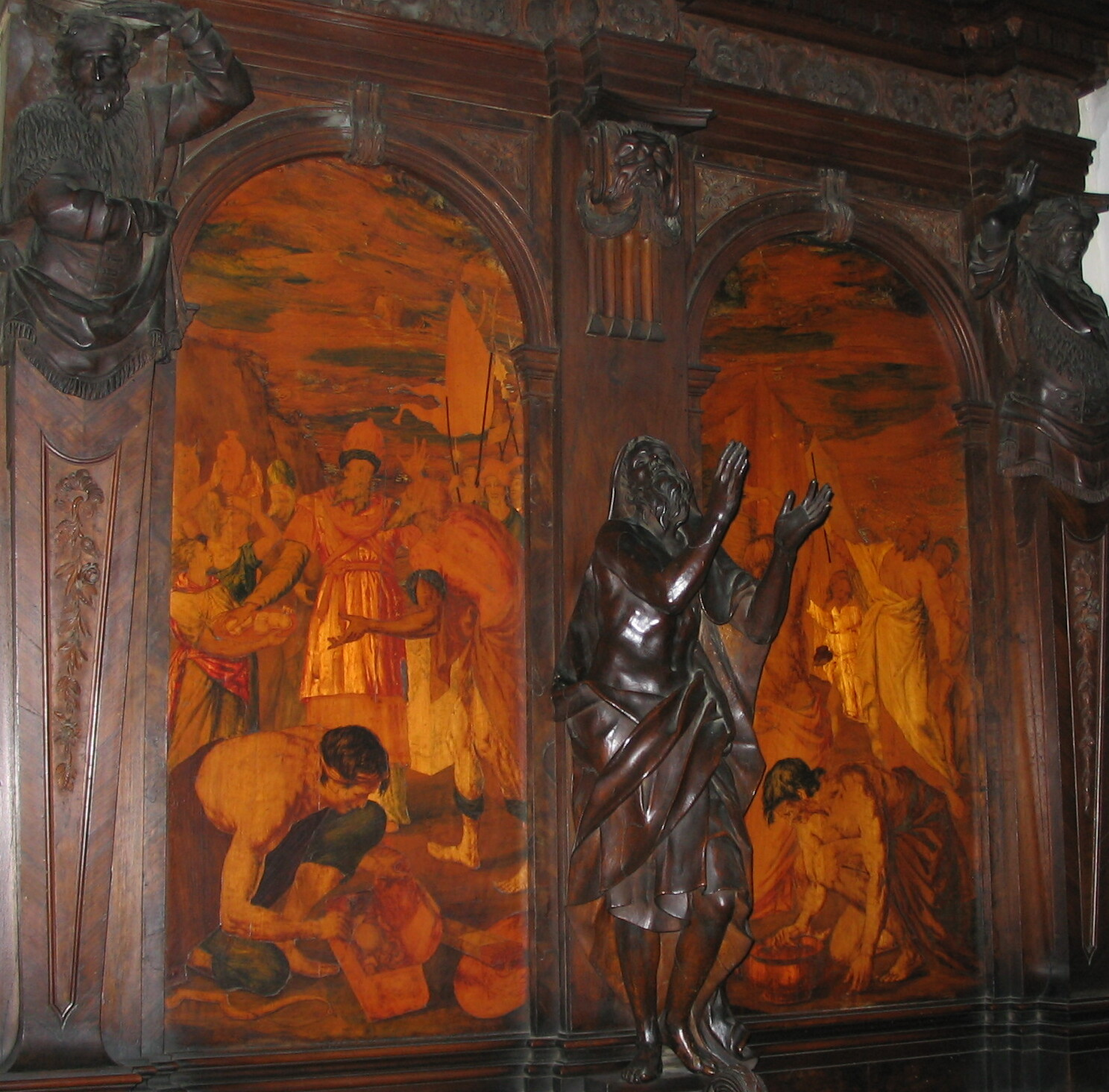
Inlays by Giovan Battista Caniana

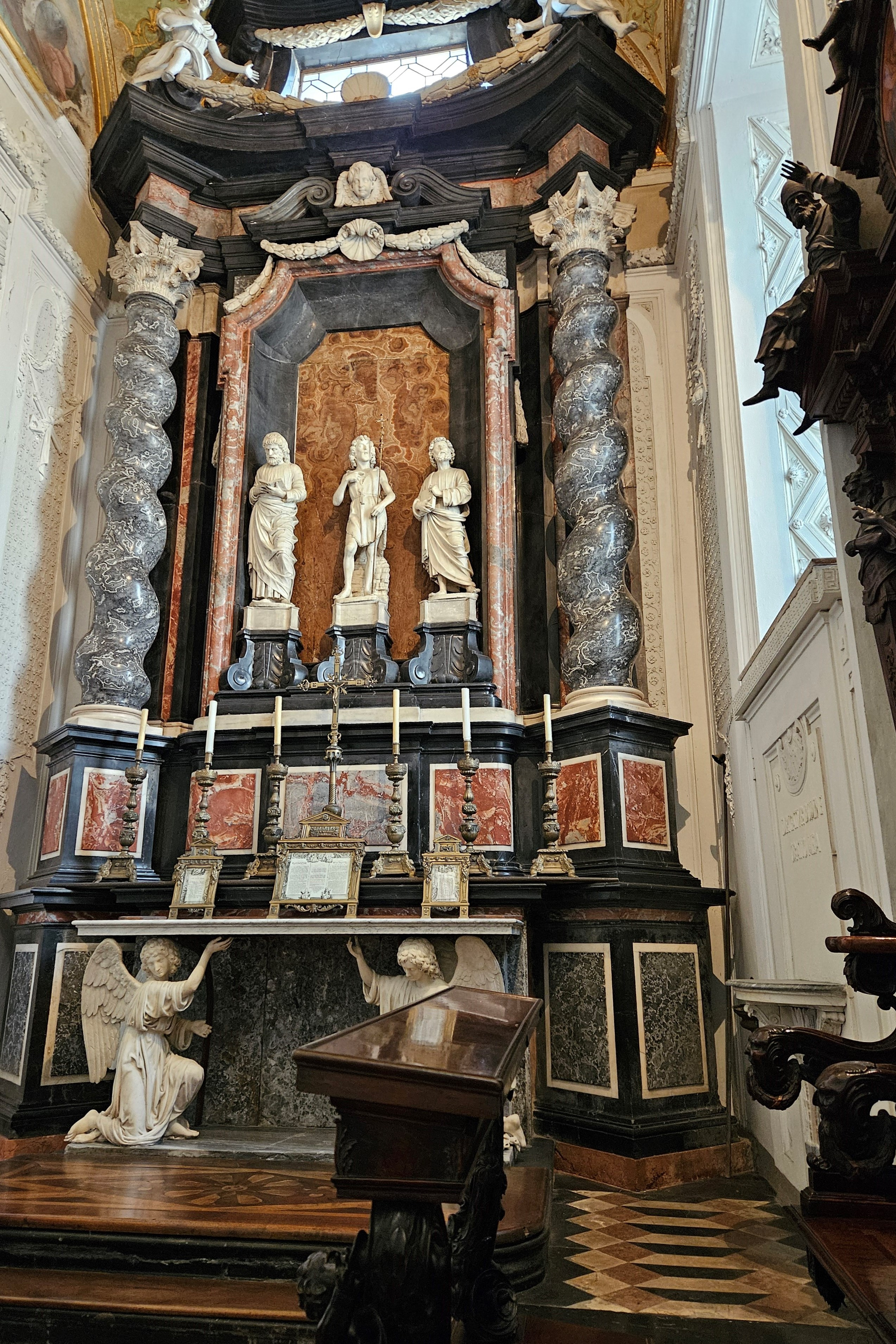
Statues of St. John the Baptist, St. Bartholomew the Apostle and St. Mark the Evangelist, works of Pietro, Tullio and Antonio Lombardo

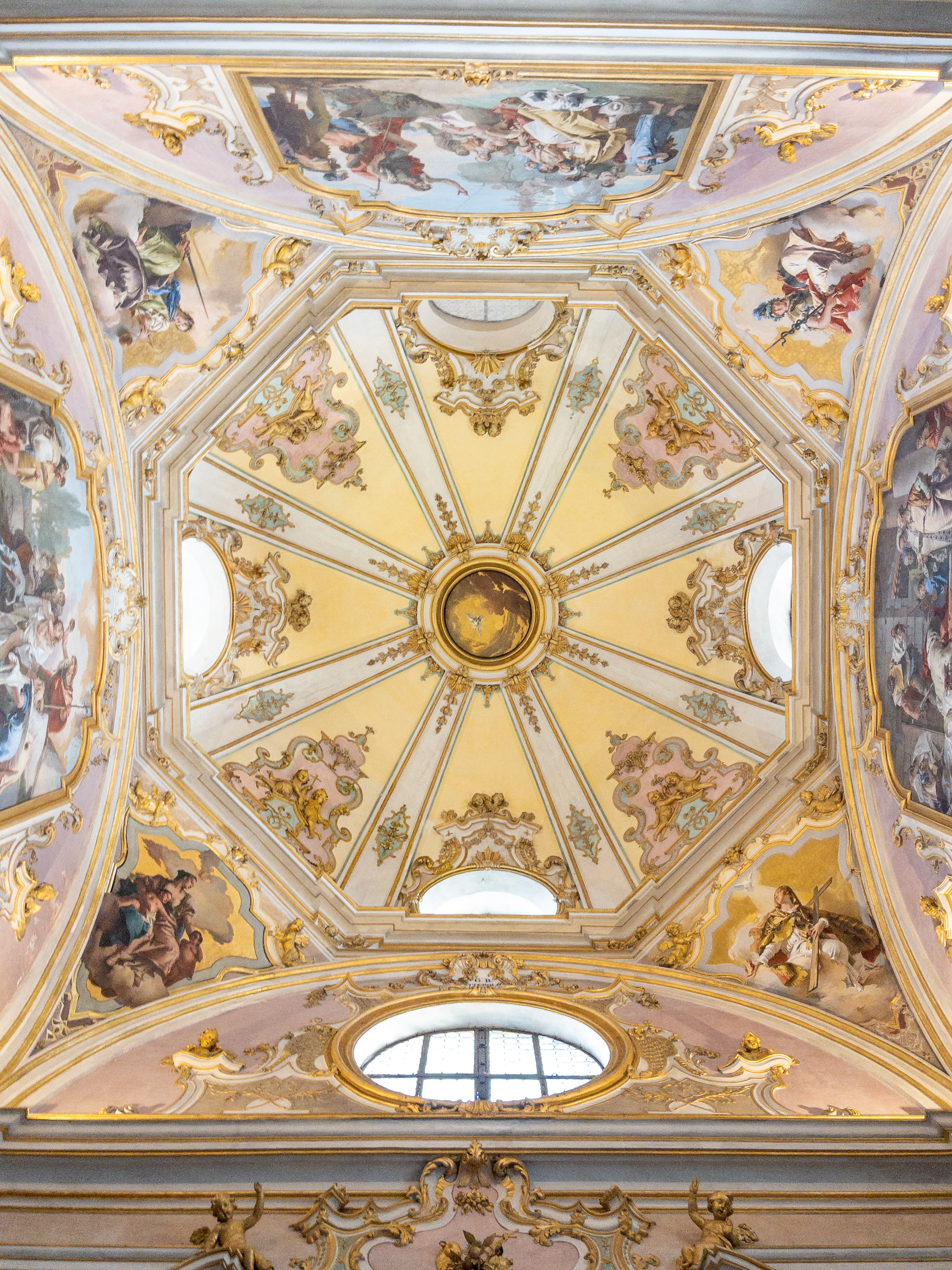
Dome

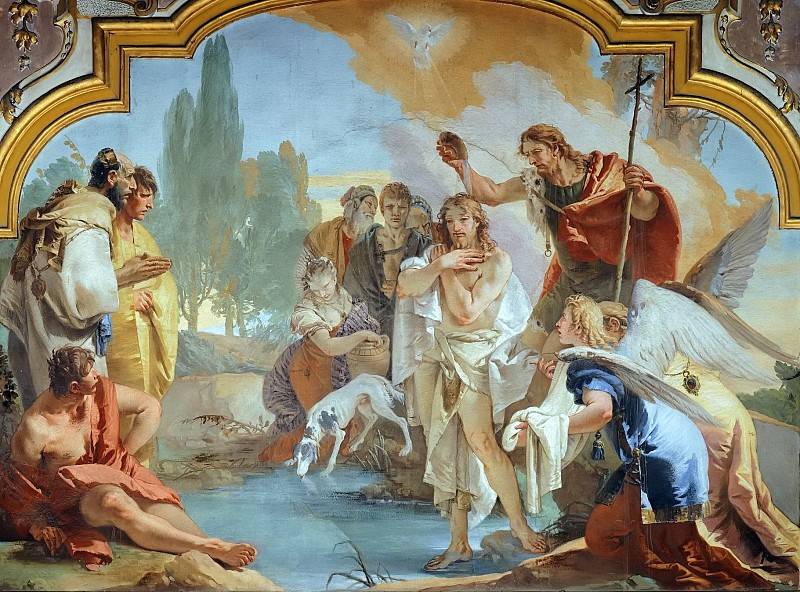
Giambattista Tiepolo, Baptism of Christ

=== The symbolism ===
The chapel is formally a Christian place but essentially a mausoleum, the apotheosis of the strength and triumph of an imperator, Colleoni, who was a descendant of Hercules, as he liked to call himself.

The complex is:

[...] a monumental complex full of hidden and obvious allusions, of structural and semantic analogies, in which the client himself erected a monument that transcends his personality in an ideal sphere.

—

The façade, with its ornamentation and contrast of rising volumes, almost combines the sacred and the pagan in the exaltation of a condottiero equated with Caesar and Trajan.

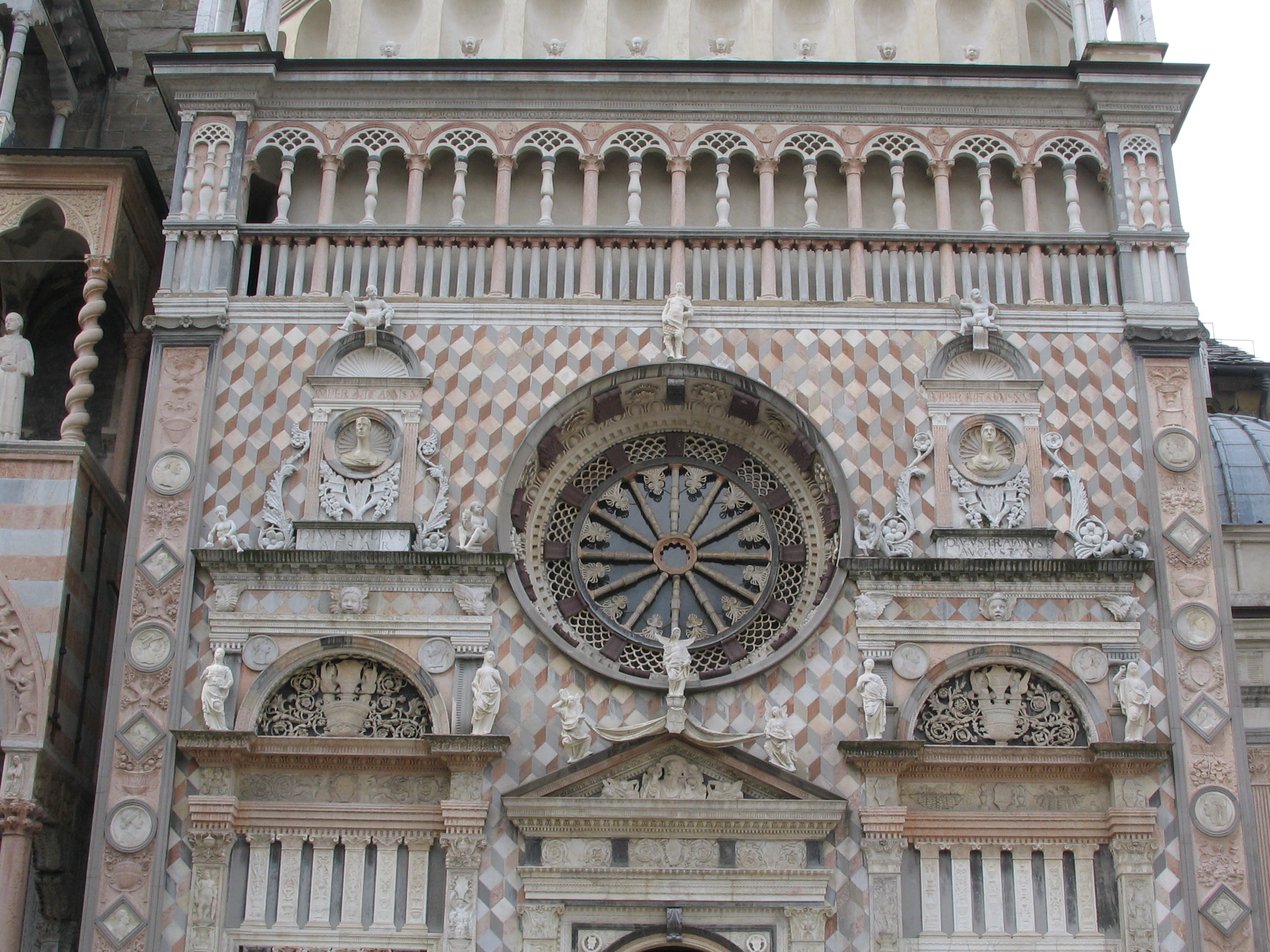
Detail of the rose window

In the center of the façade there is a rose window, the main source of light for the interior of the chapel. However, this light is not projected on the altar but on the equestrian monument of Colleoni, which dominates the religious symbols that are present in the chapel. The presbytery and the altar are thus in a position that may appear secondary, while the scene is monopolized by the condottiere who imposes himself on the visitor with his golden monument.

The rose window contains a wheel, generally a symbol of rebirth, but in this case an allegory of the sun, the sun that brought victory to Joshua and of which Bartolomeo considered himself the heir. A symbol that:

[...] served to represent those who wanted to be part of the imperial tradition: the figure of Joshua is essential in the conception of the Colleoni Chapel

— Friedrich Piel, La Cappella Colleoni e il Luogo Pio della Pietà in Bergamo, Bergamo, LPP, 1975

The entablatures of the side windows are inserted into the rose window as if to stop the movement of the wheel, in this case of Fortune, to emphasize the moment when the condottiero reaches the pinnacle of virtue and power.

This interpretation is supported by the presence, on the rose window, of a statue of a Roman soldier in a posture of joyful expectation and the busts of Caesar and Trajan, stretched out in effort, emphasized by the tension of the neck muscles. However, the statue was placed there to correct an error in the connection of the polychrome marble slabs.

The work as a whole gives:

[...] the overall sense of Bartolomeo Colleoni's personality, which he certainly was not but which he wanted to appear to the civitas of which he felt he was the patronus.

— Francesco Rossi

The Christian merges with the pagan, the church bears witness to the journey to God, and the temple deifies the imperator, as the inscriptions under the two Roman busts of Divus Iulius Caesar and Divus Traianus Augustus recall.

In the windows that flank the entrance, there are columns that resemble cannon barrels, the very same barrels that Colleoni freed from their fixed mounts, making them easy to move and thus creating a mobile artillery.

Everything in the chapel exalts the miles (soldier) in a mixture of religiosity and secularism whose boundaries and prevalence are difficult to identify.

== See also ==
- Renaissance in Lombardy
- Bartolomeo Colleoni
- Giovanni Antonio Amadeo
- Late medieval domes

== Bibliography ==
Primary sources

- Various authors (2000). Bartolomeo Colleoni. I luoghi del condottiero [Bartolomeo Colleoni. The places of the condottiero] (in Italian). Bergamo: Flash.
- Belotti, Bortolo (1953). Bergamo, la Cappella Colleoni [Bergamo, the Colleoni Chapel] (in Italian). Bergamo: Conti.
- Belotti, Bortolo (1951). La vita di Bartolomeo Colleoni [The life of Bartolomeo Colleoni] (in Italian). Bergamo: Istituto Italiano d'Arti Grafiche.
- Cornazzano, Antonio (1990). Crevatin, Giuliana (ed.). Vita di Bartolomeo Colleoni [Life of Bartolomeo Colleoni] (in Italian). Manziana: Vecchiarelli.
- Meli, Angelo (1970). Bartolomeo Colleoni ritrovato nel suo mausoleo [Bartolomeo Colleoni found in his mausoleum] (in Italian). Bergamo: Il Coventino.
- Meli, Angelo (1995). Bartolomeo Colleoni ritrovato nel suo mausoleo [Bartolomeo Colleoni found in his mausoleum] (in Italian). Dalmine: SGP.
- Meli, Angelo (2000). Bartolomeo Colleoni nel suo mausoleo [Bartolomeo Colleoni in his mausoleum] (in Italian). Bergamo: Flash.
- Berlendis, Giuseppe (1843). "Interno della Cappella Colleoni". Principali monumenti della città e provincia di Bergamo [Main monuments in the city and province of Bergamo] (in Italian). Bergamo: Stamperia Crescini.

Secondary sources and further information

- Belotti, Bortolo (1989). Storia di Bergamo e dei bergamaschi [History of Bergamo and its inhabitants] (in Italian). Bergamo: Bolis.
- Bernstein, Joanne G. (1974). Milanese and Antique Aspects of the Colleoni Chapel, Site and Symbolism. Arte Lombarda.
- Morscheck, C. R. (1993). C. R. Morscheck, Francesco Solari: Amadeo's Master?, in Janice Shell, L. Castelfranchi, G. A. Amadeo, Scultura e architettura del suo tempo. Milano: Cisalpino.
- Bortolotto, Susanna (1994). Restauro conservativo della Cappella Colleoni [Conservative restoration of the Colleoni Chapel] (in Italian). Milano: S.S.D.
- Bresciani, Efrem (1995). Cappella Colleoni in Bergamo [Colleoni Chapel in Bergamo] (in Italian). Milano: Guerini.
- Burke, Peter. Cultura e società nell'Italia del Rinascimento [Culture and society in Renaissance Italy] (in Italian). Bologna: Il Mulino.
- Burke, Peter (2001). Il Rinascimento [The Renaissance] (in Italian). Bologna: Il Mulino.
- Fumagalli, Alberto (1985). Segno dell'Amadeo, la facciata della cappella Colleoni [The Amadeo sign, the facade of the Colleoni chapel] (in Italian). Bergamo: CCIA.
- Garin, Eugenio (2005). Medioevo e Rinascimento [Middle Ages and Renaissance] (in Italian). Bari: Laterza.
- Garin, Eugenio (2000). L'uomo del Rinascimento [The Renaissance man] (in Italian). Bari: Laterza.
- Lubrina, ed. (1990). Cappella Colleoni in Bergamo, restauro sculture [Colleoni Chapel in Bergamo, restoration of sculptures] (in Italian). Bergamo: Lubrina.
- Operti, Piero (1964). Bartolomeo Colleoni (in Italian). Torino: S. E. I.
- Pesenti, Pietro (1995). La Cappella Colleoni nel gruppo monumentale di Bergamo Alta [The Colleoni Chapel in the monumental area of Upper Bergamo] (in Italian). Bergamo: Bolis.
- Piel, Friedrich (1975). La Cappella Colleoni e il Luogo pio della Pietà in Bergamo [The Colleoni Chapel and the pious place of the Pietà in Bergamo] (in Italian). Bergamo: Luogo pio della pietà Bartolomeo Colleoni.
- Ragionieri, Adolfo; Martinelli, Antonio (1990). Bartolomeo Colleoni dall'Isola all'Europa [Bartolomeo Colleoni from the Island to Europe] (in Italian). Bergamo: CII.
- Pagnoni, Luigi (1992). Chiese parrocchiali bergamasche: appunti di storia e arte [Parish churches in Bergamo: notes on history and art] (in Italian). Bergamo. p. 324.
- Langè, Santino; Pacciarotti, Giuseppe (1994). Barocco Alpino. Arte e architettura religiosa del Seicento: spazio e figuratività [Alpine Baroque. 17th-century religious art and architecture: space and figuration] (in Italian). Milano: Jaca Book. p. 220..
- Mazzariol, Paolo (2009). Paolo Mazzariol, I Camuzio di Montagnola. Stuccatori a Bergamo e nel Bergamasco, in Giorgio Mollisi (a cura di), Svizzeri a Bergamo nella storia, nell'arte, nella cultura, nell'economia dal '500 ad oggi. Campionesi a Bergamo nel Medioevo, Arte&Storia, anno 10, numero 44. pp. 236–245.
