= Colleoni =

Noble family in medieval Bergamo

Arms of the House of Colleoni, depicting three pairs of human testicles. It was later changed to three upside-down hearts.

The House of Colleoni was a Guelph-allied noble family in medieval Bergamo. Their Ghibelline opponents were the Suardi family, of which the Colleoni themselves were a branch.

== History ==
The family's coat of arms was two pairs of white testicles on a red field, above one red pair on a white field.

== See also ==
- A Gun for Sale – 1936 novel by Graham Greene
- Palazzo Colleoni alla Pace
- Cappella Colleoni
- Bartolomeo Colleoni
