= Bartolomeo Colleoni =

15th-century Italian mercenary and military officer of the Republic of Venice

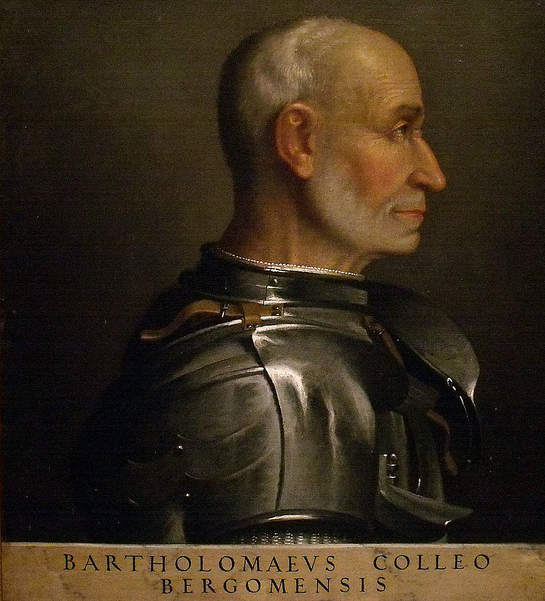
- BARTHOLOMAEVS COLLEO BERGOMENSIS (Bartolomeo Colleoni of Bergamo)
- Born: Bartolomeo Colleoni c. 1400; Solza, Duchy of Milan
- Died: 2 November 1475 (aged 74–75); Malpaga Castle, Republic of Venice
- Occupation: Condottiero
- Known for: Captain-General of Venice
- Children: Medea Colleoni

Bartolomeo Colleoni (Italian pronunciation: [bartoloˈmɛːo kolleˈoːni]; 1400 – 2 November 1475) was an Italian condottiero who served as the captain-general of the Republic of Venice. Colleoni gained a reputation as one of the foremost tacticians and disciplinarians of the 15th century. He is also credited with refurbishing the Roman baths at Trescore Balneario.

== Biography ==
=== Background ===
Coat of arms of Bartolomeo Colleoni with augmentation by René of Anjou, featuring three pairs of testicles. The name "Colleoni" was in Bartolomeo's day alternately spelled "Coglione", a vulgar term meaning "balls".

Colleoni was born in Solza near Bergamo, which was then part of the Duchy of Milan. In Bergamo Colleoni later built himself a mortuary chapel, the Cappella Colleoni. The Colleoni family was noble, but had been exiled with the rest of the Guelphs by the Visconti of Milan. Bartolomeo's father Paolo Colleoni had seized the castle of Trezzo, until he was assassinated by his cousins, probably acting on the orders of Filippo Maria Visconti, Duke of Milan.

=== Career ===
The young Colleoni trained as a soldier, first in the retinue of Filippo d'Arcello, the new master of Piacenza. Then he entered the service of various condottieri, beginning with Braccio da Montone, who was skirmishing in Apulia, profiting from the struggles between Alfonso of Aragon and Louis of Anjou during the weak sovereignty of Queen Joan II and taking Alfonso's cause, then that of Carmagnola. After the latter was put to death in Venice (1432), Colleoni entered the direct service of the Venetian Republic, which represented the major phase of his career.

Although Gianfrancesco I Gonzaga, Marquess of Mantua was nominally commander-in-chief, Colleoni was in fact the real leader of the army. He recaptured many towns and districts for Venice from the Milanese, and when Gonzaga went over to the enemy, Colleoni continued to serve the Venetians under Erasmo of Narni (known as Gattamelata) and Francesco I Sforza, winning battles at Brescia, Verona, and on the Lake of Garda.

When peace was made between Milan and Venice in 1441, Colleoni joined the Milanese, together with Sforza, in 1443. Although well treated at first, Colleoni soon fell under the Visconti's suspicion and was imprisoned at Monza, where he remained until the duke's death in 1447. The Milanese then proclaimed the Golden Ambrosian Republic with Sforza as commander-in-chief, whom Colleoni served for a time, most notably defeating the French at the Battle of Bosco Marengo. In 1448, he took leave of Sforza and returned to the Venetians until 1451. Disgusted at not having been elected captain-general, he once more went over to Sforza (who had conquered Milan in 1450, ending the Ambrosian Republic and being recognised as the new Milanese duke) in 1452, but Venice could not do without him; by offering him greater emoluments, the Venetians induced him to return in 1453, and in 1455 he was appointed captain-general of the Republic of Venice for life. Although he occasionally fought on his own account when Venice was at peace, he remained at the disposal of the republic in time of war until his death.

=== Retirement ===
He set his residence in the castle of Malpaga, which he had bought in 1465 and restored in the years following. Although he often changed sides, no act of treachery is imputed to him, nor did he subject the territories he passed through to the raping and robbery practiced by other soldiers of fortune. When not fighting, he devoted his time to introducing agricultural improvements on the vast estates which the Venetians had granted him, and to charitable works. At his death in 1475, at Malpaga, he left a large sum to the republic for the Turkish war, with a request that an equestrian statue of himself should be erected in the Piazza San Marco. The statue was modelled by Andrea del Verrocchio and cast in bronze after his death by Alessandro Leopardi, but, as no monument was permitted in the piazza, it was placed near the Scuola Grande of St Mark outside the Church of SS Giovanni e Paolo.

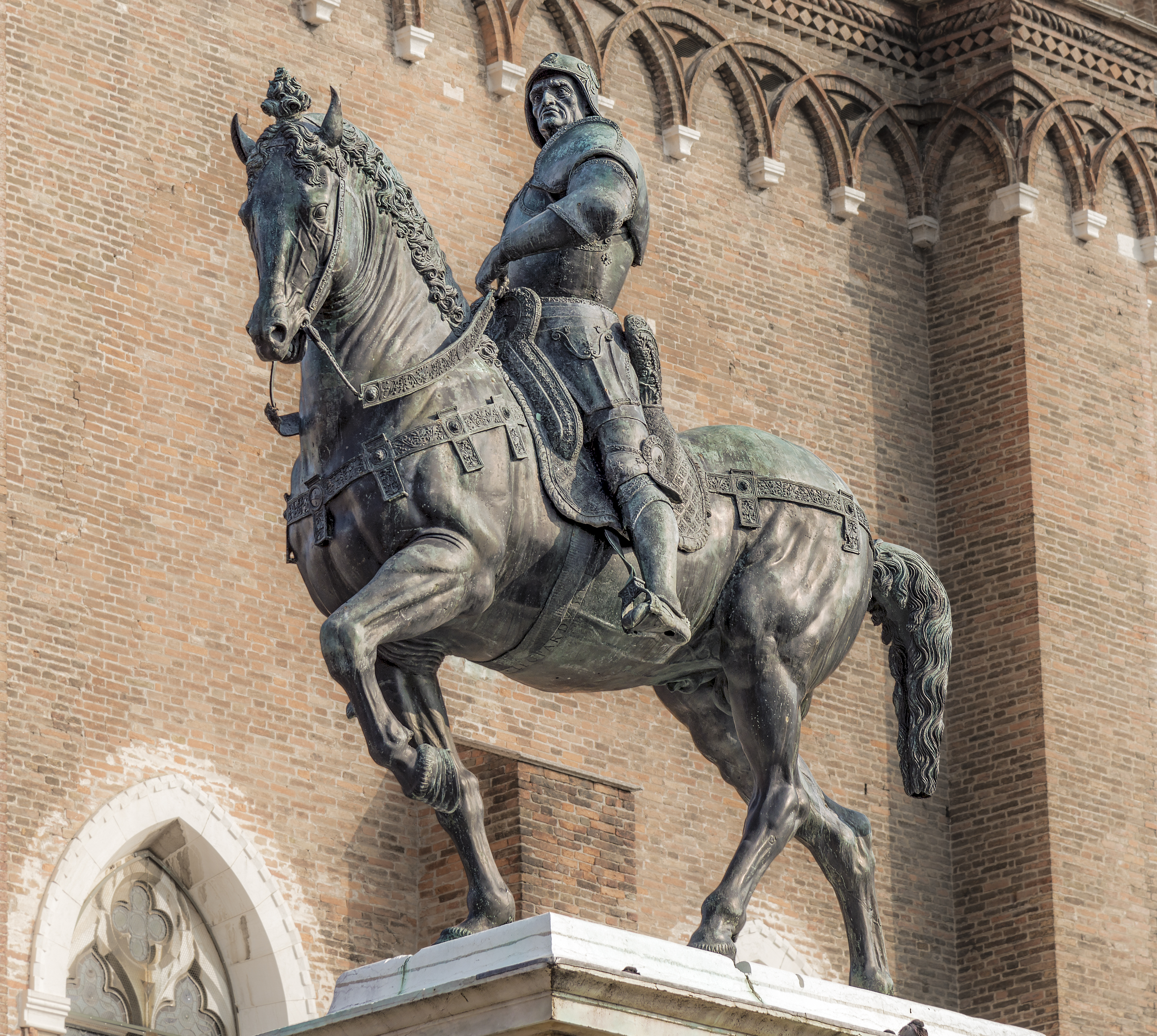
Equestrian statue of Bartolomeo Colleoni by Verrocchio, located in Venice, Italy

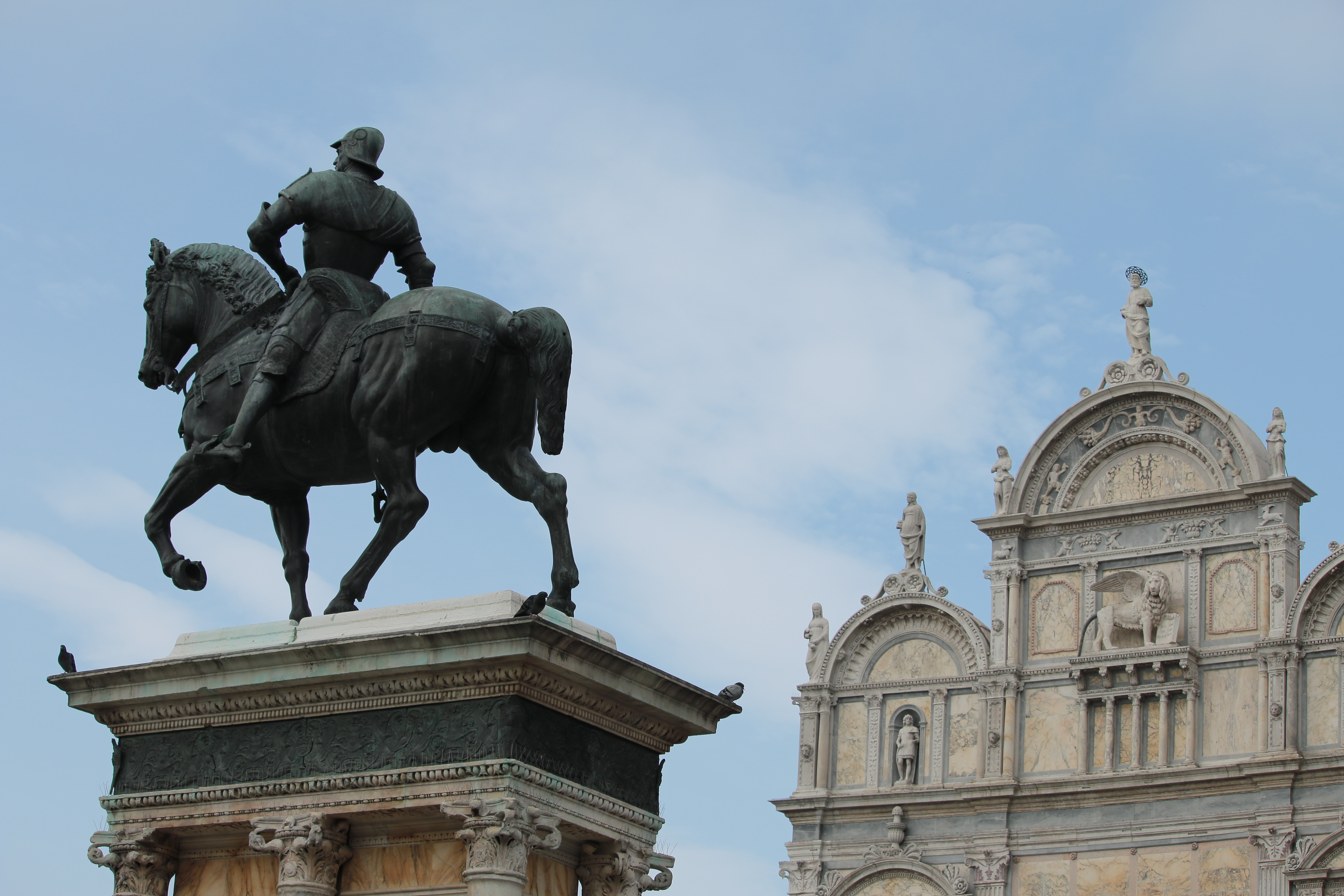
Statue of Colleoni at Campo Santi Giovanni e Paolo, Venice, opposite the Scuola Grande di San Marco

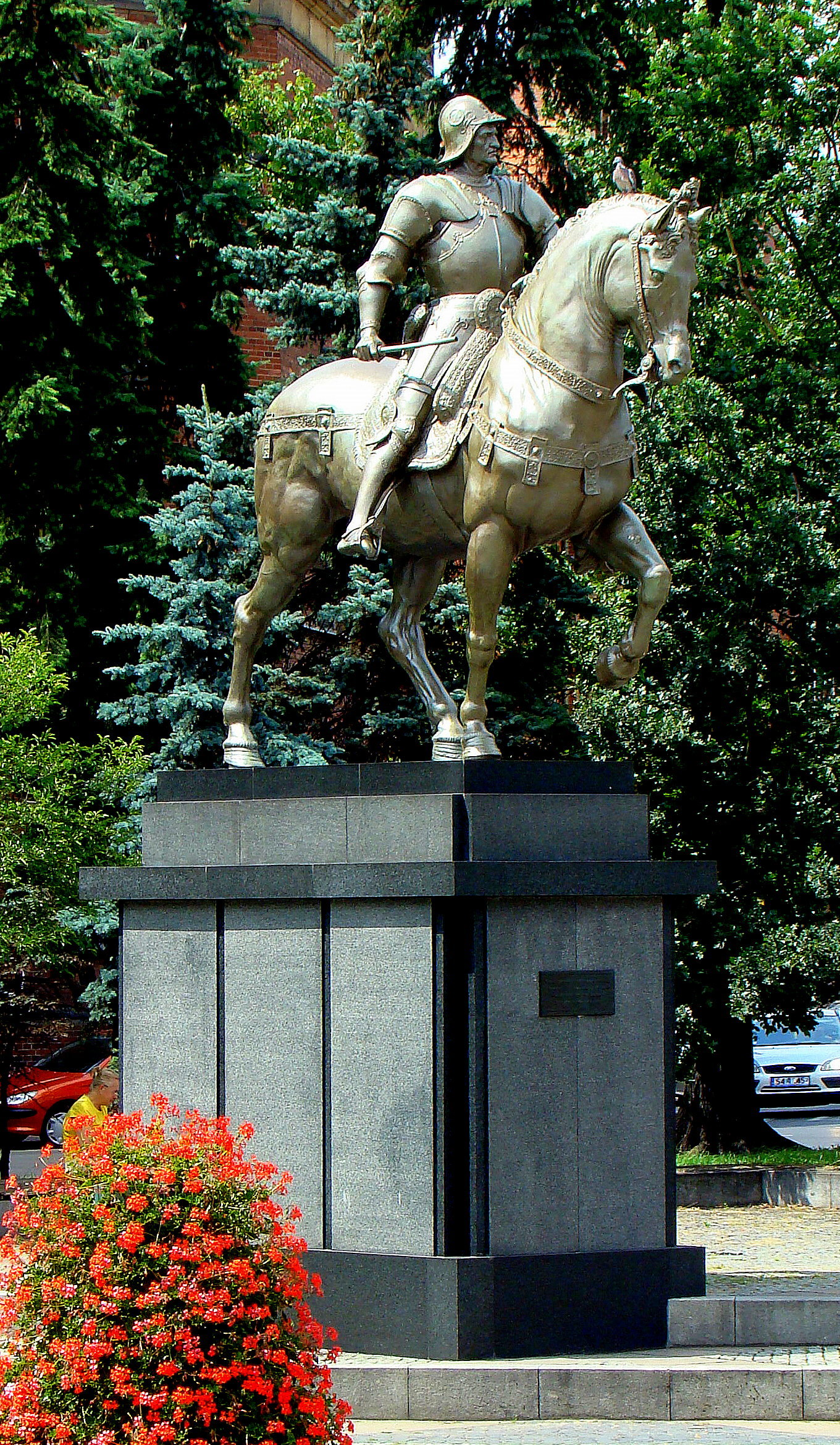
Monument to Bartolomeo Colleoni at Aviators Square, Szczecin, Poland

== See also ==
- Palazzo Colleoni alla Pace

== Footnotes ==
- Rendina, Claudio (1994). I capitani di ventura. Rome: Newton Compton.
