= Malpaga Castle =

Castle in Cavernago, Italy

Coordinates: 45°37′01″N 9°45′31″E

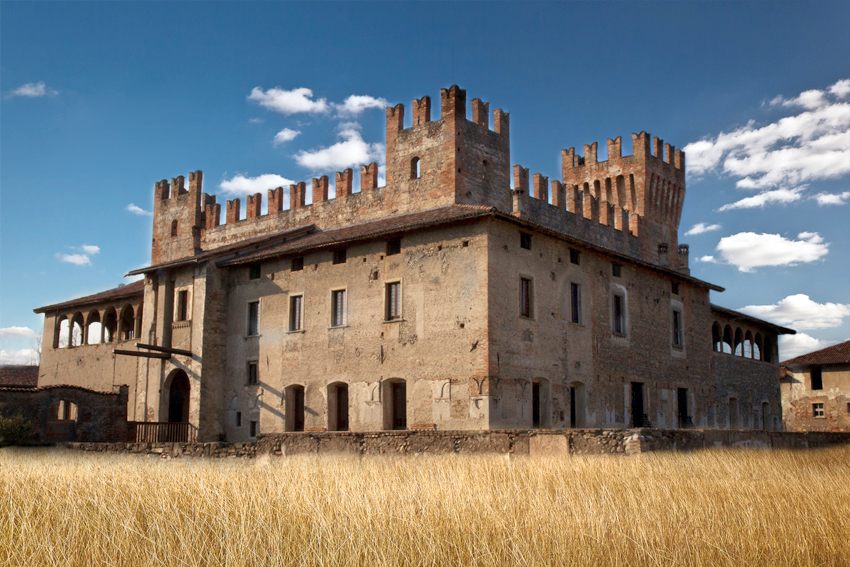
The castle is surrounded by fields of wheat

The Malpaga Castle (Italian: Castello di Malpaga) is a castle in the communal territory of Cavernago, a village in the province of Bergamo, northern Italy. Its main features are the interior rooms frescoed by the Renaissance painter Il Romanino.

== History ==
An early medieval castle had been in ruins after a raid in the 1440s. In 1456, the condottiero and nobleman Bartolomeo Colleoni acquired the ruined castle from the commune of Bergamo. He enlarged and enriched it not only as a military base for his troops, but also as a seigneurial residence, in the typical Italian Renaissance fashion.

The castle layout is square, surrounded by two lines of walls and a ditch. The first line, now disappeared, included the stables and the barracks. The walls are characterized by merlons. The castle's internal walls are almost entirely frescoed, although some of them have deteriorated or been vandalized. Some frescoes celebrate the 1474 visit of King Christian I of Denmark and the sumptuous hospitality given him by Bartolomeo Colleoni, including banquets, hunting expeditions and tournaments. They were commissioned by Bartolomeo's heirs around 1520–1530 to celebrate the family's most famous member, and are attributed to Il Romanino. On the first floor are 17th-century frescoes of lesser quality.

Aside from Christian I's visit, the frescoes also depict allegories, such as that of Silence (an allusion to the secrets which should be kept by the castle's personnel), and the idealized portraits of Colleoni and the king. In the courtyard, also attributed to Romanino, is the depiction of the Battle of Molinella (or Riccardina), fought by Colleoni in 1467 near Bologna. Another 15th-century fresco of the Madonna with Child, by an unknown artist, is found in Colleoni's private studio.

== Gallery ==
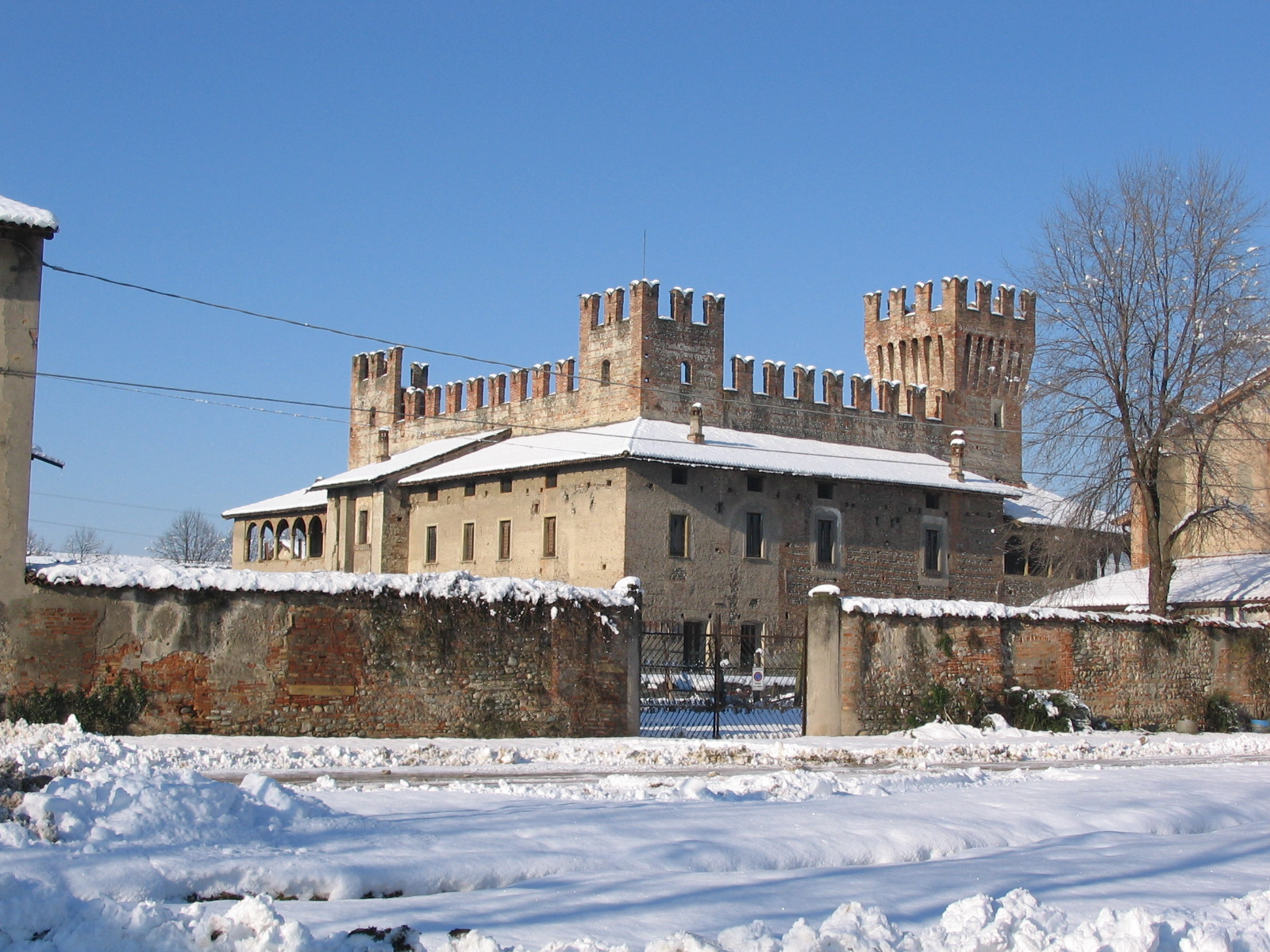
The castle in winter

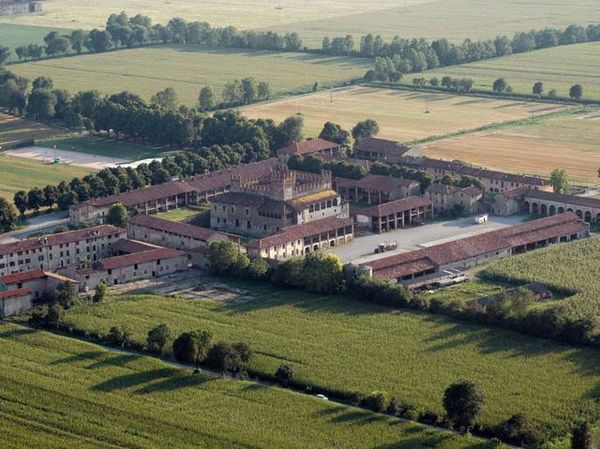
An aerial view of the castle

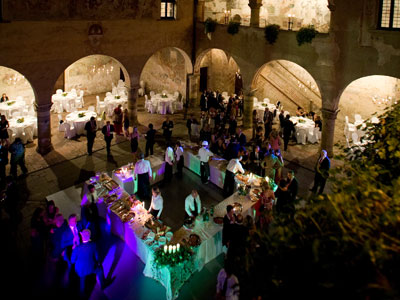
A dinner at the castle

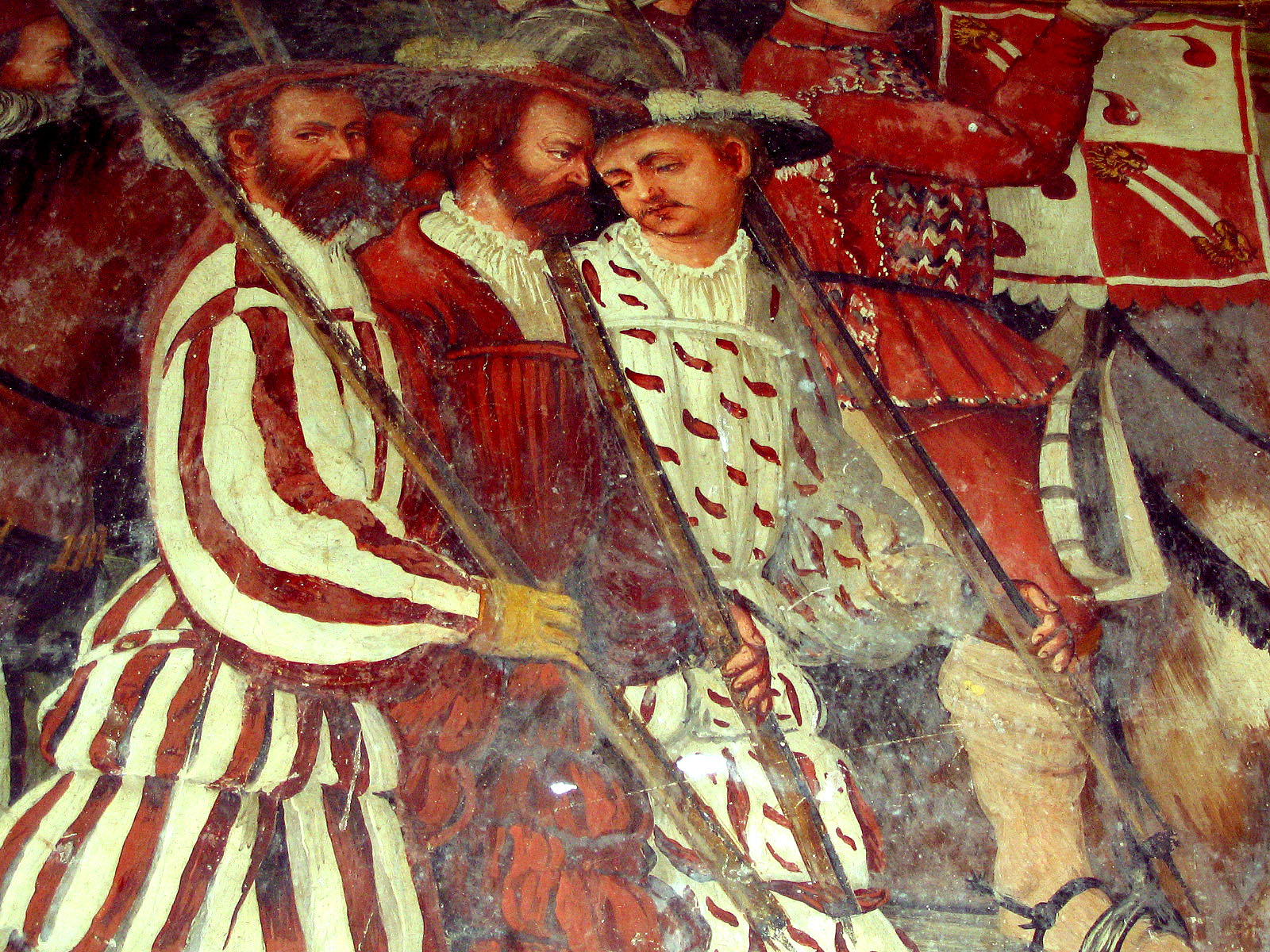
A fresco with soldiers

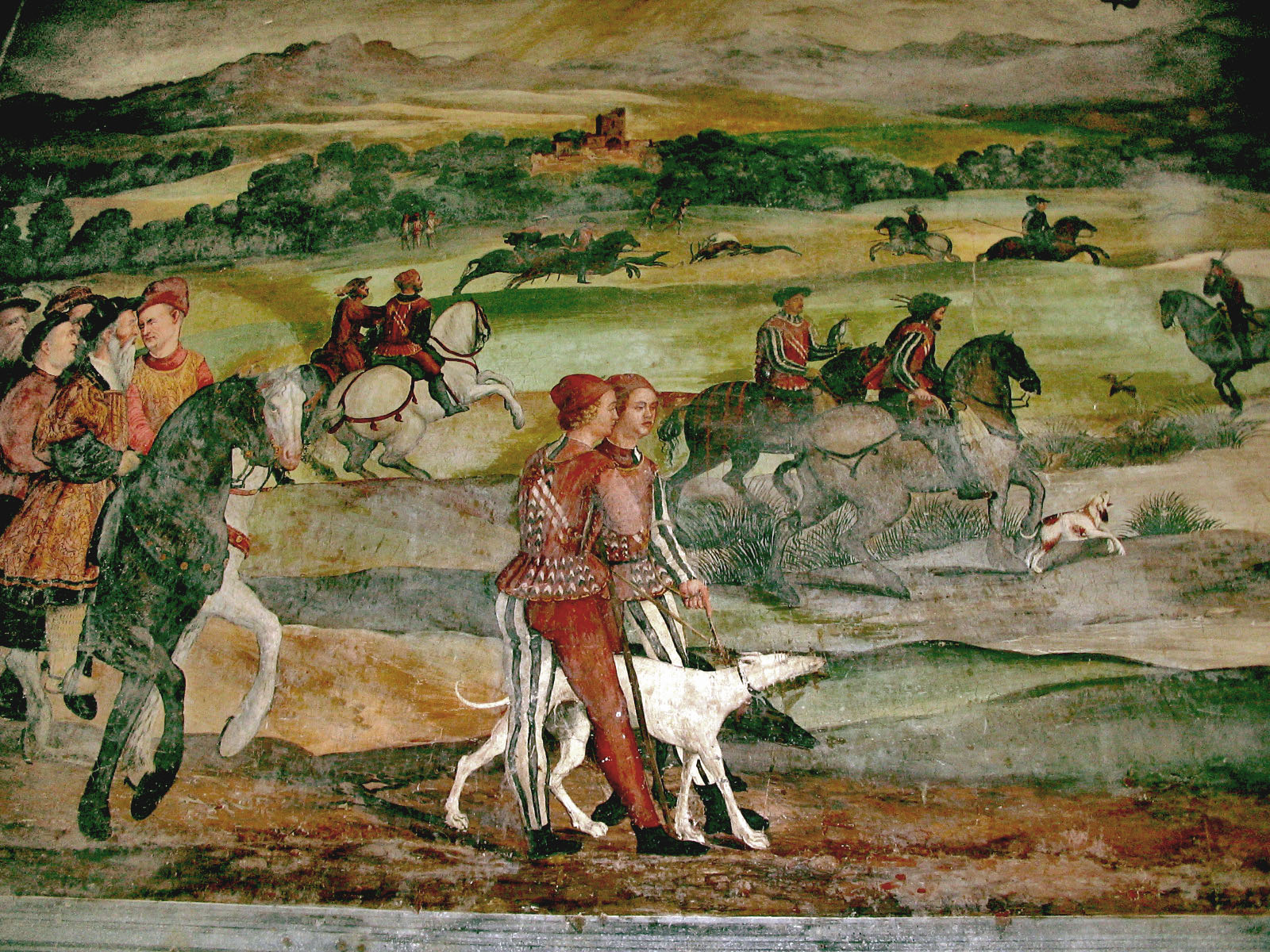
Hunting scene

== Sources ==
- Cornazzano, Antonio (1990). G. Crevatin (ed.). Vita di Bartolomeo Colleoni. Manziana: Vecchiarelli. ISBN 88-85316-16-6.
- G., Finazzi (1870). I Guelfi e Ghibellini in Bergamo. Bergamo.
