= Santa Maria della Pace, Brescia =

Church in Brescia, Italy

Coordinates: 45.5397°N 10.2153°E

Saint Mary of the Peace Church (Chiesa di Santa Maria della Pace in Italian) is a Baroque-style, Roman Catholic church located on Via Pace in central Brescia, region of Lombardy, Italy. The church belongs to the Oratorians.

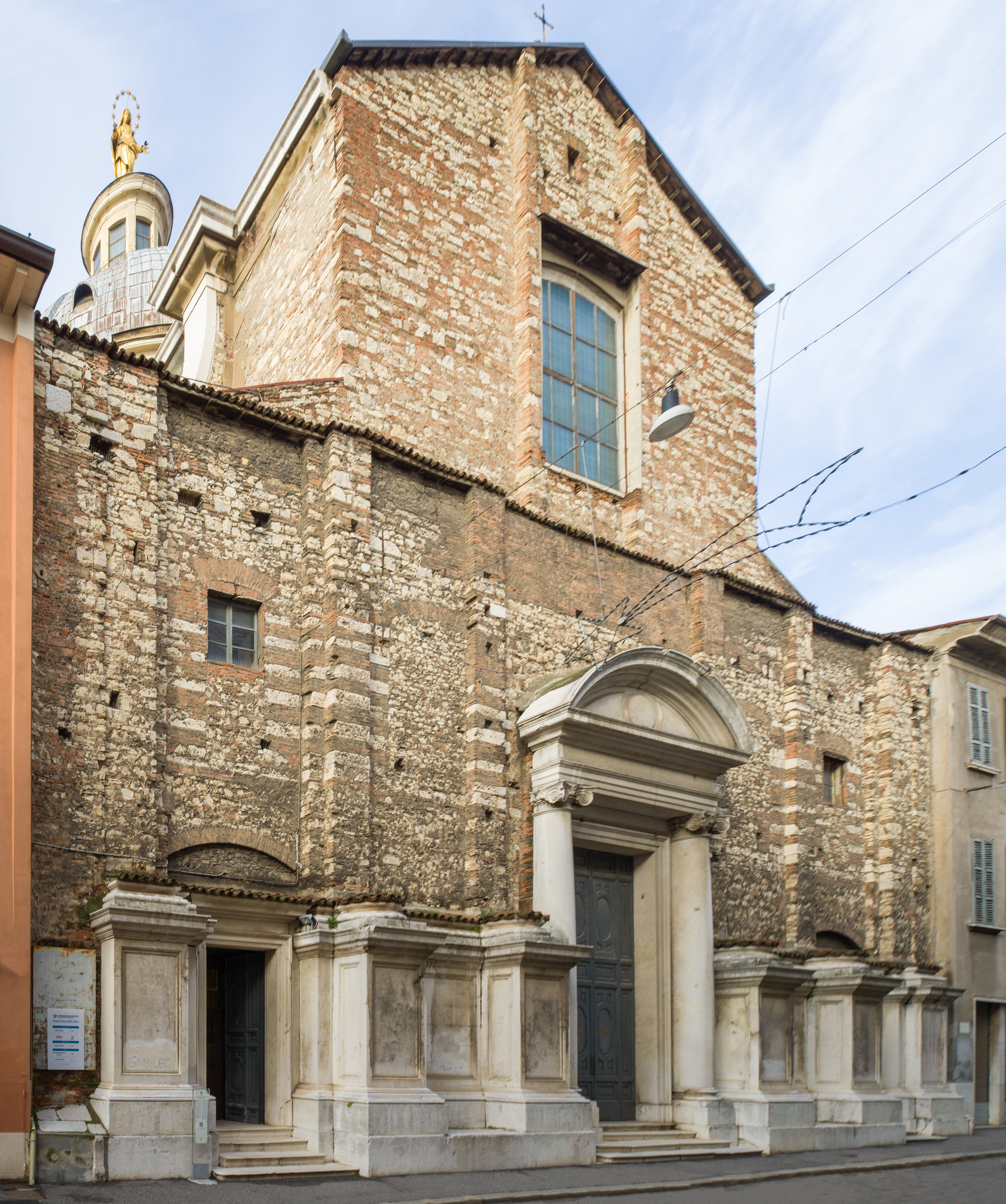
Facade

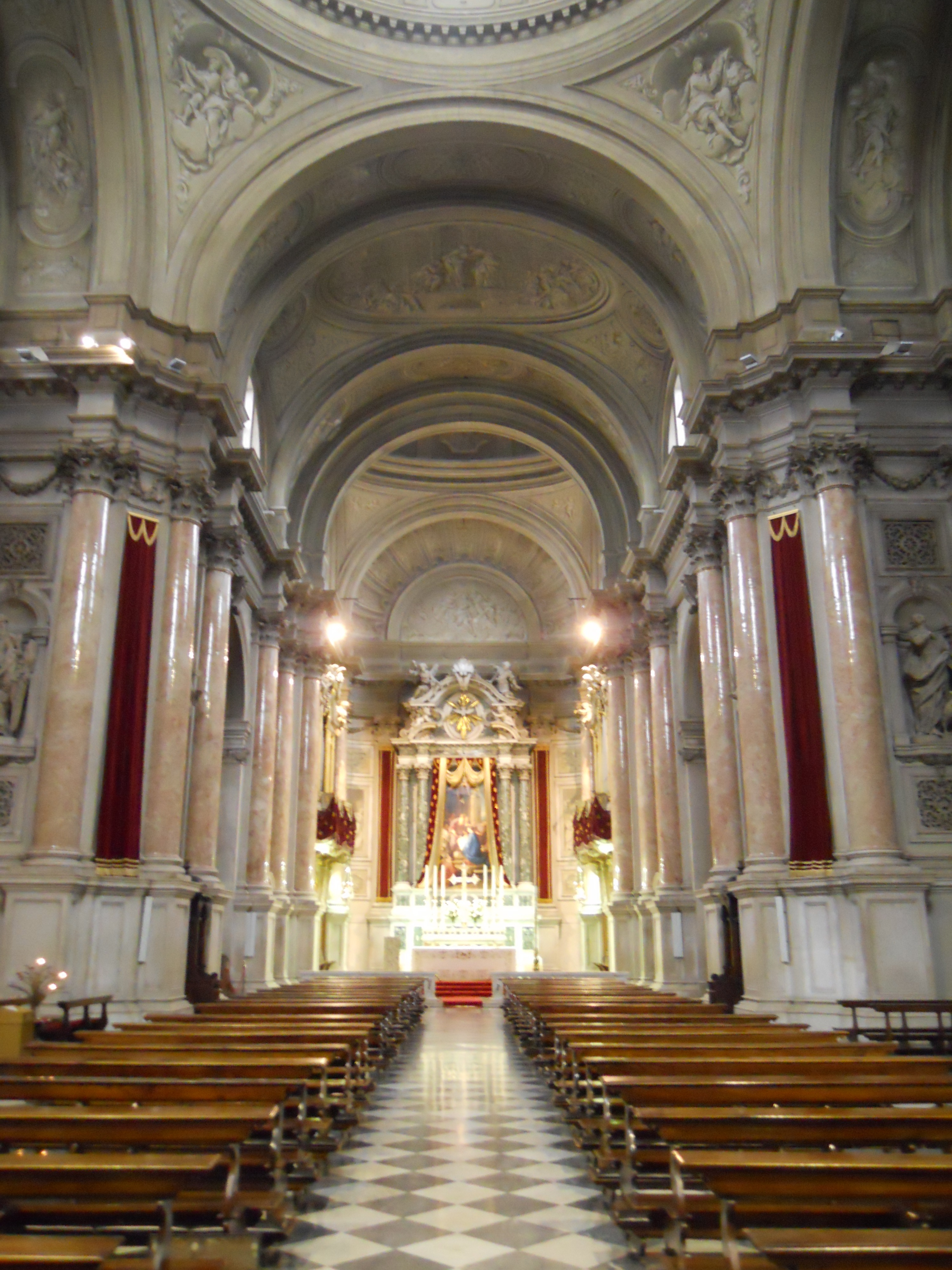
Interior

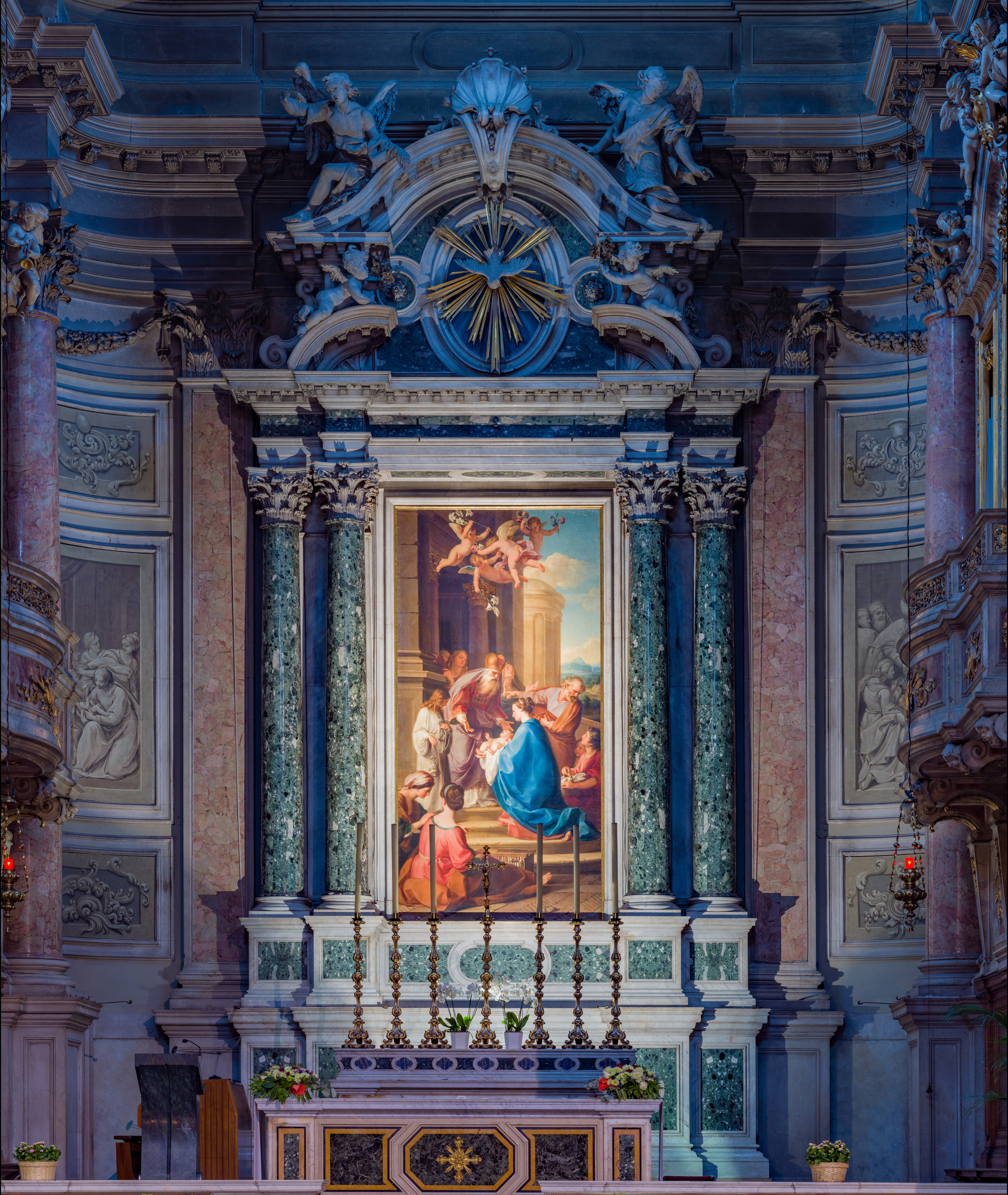
Main altar with Presentation of Jesus at the Temple by Pompeo Batoni. Tympanum with sculptures by Antonio Calegari.

== History ==
This church was commissioned by the Oratorians. The architect of the domed centralized church was Venetian architect Giorgio Massari. Construction began in 1720 and ended in 1746. The unfinished facade stands in contrast with an opulent interior that includes pink marble Corinthian columns and statues of the apostles by artist Antonio Calegari of Brescia. The nave of the church has two fresco-style paintings painted by Francesco Monti and Giovanni Zanardi. The main altar is flanked by ornate musical organs.

The interiors contain the following paintings:

- San Filippo Neri, 1st altar on left, by Jacopo Zoboli
- San Francesco di Sales, 4th altar on left, by Antonio Balestra
- Presentation at Temple (1747), main altarpiece, by Pompeo Batoni
- St John Nepomunk, also by Batoni

The convent also had a Presentation at the temple by Marone, and the oratory a St Phillip Neri by Pietro Deorazio.
