= Bortolo Belotti =

Italian politician (1877–1944)

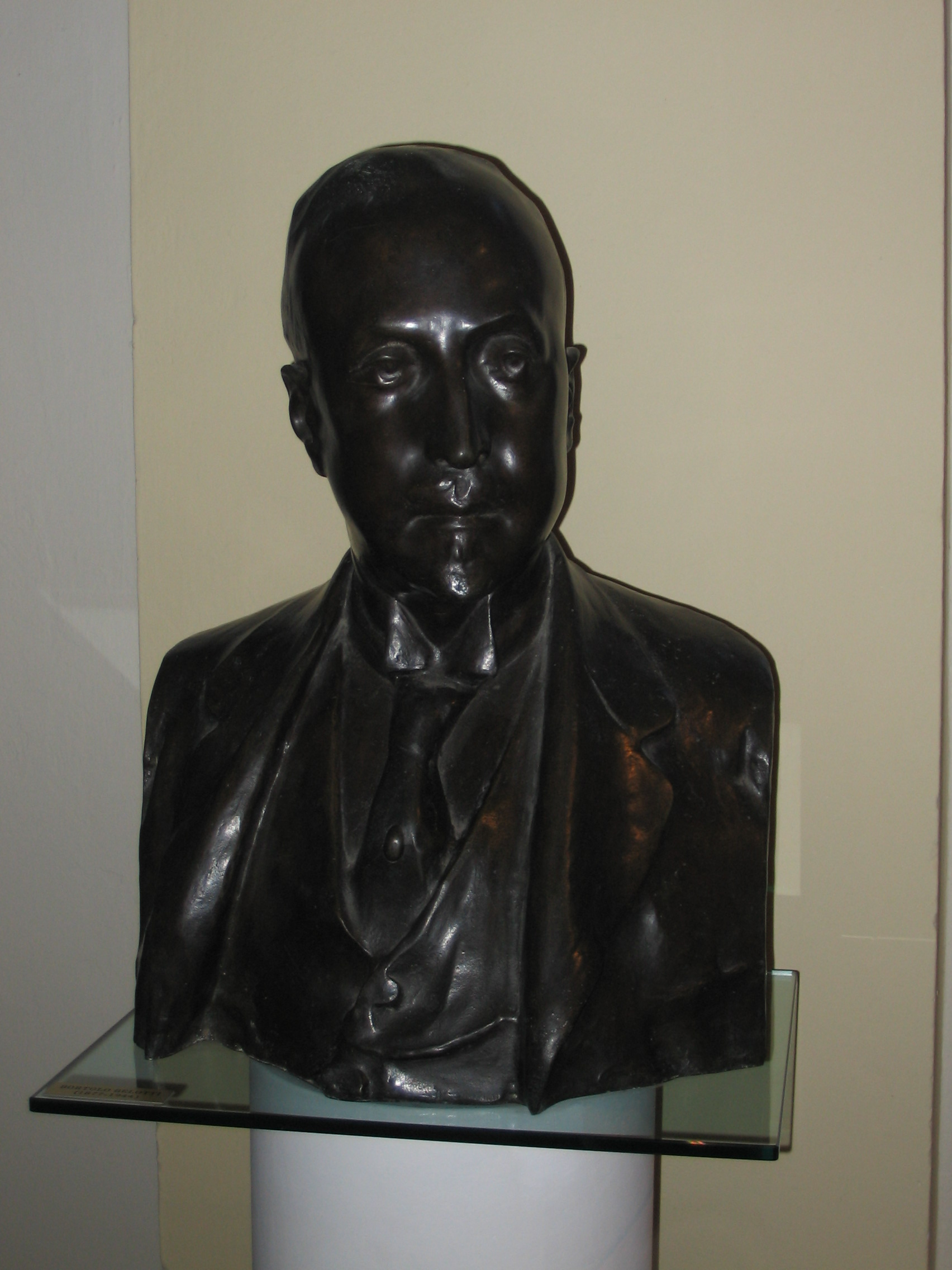
Bust of Belotti

Bortolo Belotti (26 August 1877 – 24 July 1944) was an Italian politician of the first half of 20th century.

== Life ==
Born in Zogno, son of a wealthy family, he studied law at the University of Pavia and then became a lawyer. In 1907, he joined the Italian Liberal Party and in 1913 he was elected to the Chamber of Deputies for the constituency of his native Val Brembana. In 1919, he was re-elected to the lower house as undersecretary of Economy and was then named minister of Minister of Industry and Commerce in the first Bonomi cabinet. Belotti took this post for about seven months and after the collapse of the government, he resigned from his post like all the ministers of the cabinet.

After the March on Rome and the takeover of the Fascist Party, Belotti briefly supported Benito Mussolini because, like many Italians, he believed that Mussolini was the only "strong man" able to defeat the socialists. From 1923, Belotti opposed fascism and did not participate in the election of 1924 because his party, the Liberal Party, supported the fascists.

In 1930, he was arrested for 20 days for his anti-fascist activities and then deported for some months to Cava de' Tirreni. After that, Belotti retired from politics, but in 1943 he was forced to flee to Switzerland in order to escape from the Italian Social Republic. He died in exile in 1944.
