= The Hanged Man (Da Vinci's Demons) =

- Da Vinci's Demons episode
- Episode no.: Season 1 Episode 1
- Directed by: David S. Goyer
- Written by: David S. Goyer
- Cinematography by: Julian Court
- Editing by: Tim Murrell
- Production codes: Phantom 4 Films; Adjacent LA; Starz Originals; BBC Worldwide Productions
- Original air date: April 12, 2013
- Running time: 57 min

Episode chronology
← Previous —	Next → "The Serpent"

"The Hanged Man" is the pilot episode of the American TV series Da Vinci's Demons. It was written and directed by David S. Goyer, and stars Tom Riley, Laura Haddock, Elliot Cowan, Blake Ritson and Lara Pulver. It is produced by Starz! Network and BBC Worldwide. The story focuses on Leonardo da Vinci and his two companions Zoroaster and Nico, who took Florence and established alliance with Lorenzo de' Medici.

Richard Edwards, from Games Radar, said it is an "odd mix of a Doctor Who historical episode and Game of Thrones; a hyper-real vision of history mixed with copious amounts of political sculduggery, nudity, sex and violence".

It received 1.042 million viewers in United States.

== Plot ==
Lorenzo Medici gives Leonardo the contract to paint his lover Lucrezia, and he takes the opportunity to sell him his designs of airplanes, automatic load cannons and tanks. At the Carnival, Leonardo's mechanical pigeon flies and he has a sexual encounter with a masked Lucrezia, who's later revealed to be an agent of Riario and the Vatican. She tells the Pope about the weapons Leonardo is planning for Lorenzo and about his encounter with the Turk.

== Cast ==
- Tom Riley as Leonardo da Vinci
  - Ted Allpress as the young Leonardo da Vinci
- Laura Haddock as Lucrezia Donati
- Blake Ritson as Girolamo Riario
- Elliot Cowan as Lorenzo de' Medici
- Lara Pulver as Clarice Orsini
- Gregg Chillin as Zoroaster da Peretola
- Hera Hilmar as Vanessa
- Eros Vlahos as Nico
- James Faulkner as Pope Sixtus IV
- David Schofield as Piero da Vinci
- Alexander Siddig as Al-Rahim
- Tom Bateman as Giuliano de' Medici
- Allan Corduner as Andrea del Verrocchio
- Michael Elwyn as Gentile de' Becchi
- Michael Culkin as Jacopo de' Pazzi
- Nick Dunning as Lupo Mercuri
- Elliot Levey as Francesco de' Pazzi
- Ken Bones as The Jew
- Mathew David as Naked Boy
- Harry Atwell as Visconti
- Iain Mitchell as Cicco
- Mark Sumner as Conti
- Matthew Tennyson as Altar Boy
- Jordan Bernarde as Roland
- Roger Evans as The Bird Seller
- Ian Pirie as Captain Dragonetti
- Christopher Elson as Jacopo Saltarelli
- Tim Faraday as Black Martin
- Grant Stimpson as Morgante
- David Mounfield as Town Cryer
- John Weldon as Inn Keeper
- Nicholas Rowe as Cardinal Orsini
- Hugh Bonneville as Duke of Milan Galeazzo Maria Sforza
- Pino Maiello as Neopolitan Captain
- Gavin Sims as Drag Queen
