= The Serpent (Da Vinci's Demons) =

- Da Vinci's Demons episode
- Episode no.: Season 1 Episode 2
- Directed by: David S. Goyer
- Written by: David S. Goyer; Scott M. Gimple
- Cinematography by: Julian Court
- Editing by: Philip Kloss
- Production codes: Phantom 4 Films; Adjacent LA; Starz Originals; BBC Worldwide Productions
- Original air date: April 19, 2013
- Running time: 59 min

Episode chronology
← Previous "The Hanged Man"	Next → "The Prisoner"

"The Serpent" is the second episode of the American TV series Da Vinci's Demons. It picked up after the end of first episode with da Vinci performing an autopsy on the body of the hanged man.

Ron Hogan, from Den of Geek, said it is a "good television show, but two episodes in it hasn't emerged from the sketchbook into the realm of reality".

It got 0.503 million viewers in United States.

== Plot ==
da Vinci studies anatomy with an executed human cadaver; he searches for a "soul" in the stomach.

da Vinci continues his paintings of Lucrezia Donati for his Medici patron Lorenzo de' Medici.

Riario is the nephew of Pope Sixtus IV. Riaro tortures Nico, da Vinci's assistant.

== Cast ==
- Tom Riley as Leonardo da Vinci
- Laura Haddock as Lucrezia Donati
- Blake Ritson as Girolamo Riario
- Elliot Cowan as Lorenzo de' Medici
- Lara Pulver as Clarice Orsini
- Tom Bateman as Giuliano de' Medici
- Gregg Chillin as Zoroaster da Peretola
- Allan Corduner as Andrea del Verrocchio
- Nick Dunning as Lupo Mercuri
- Michael Elwyn as Gentile de' Becchi
- Hera Hilmar as Vanessa
- David Schofield as Piero da Vinci
- Eros Vlahos as Nico
- Ken Bones as The Jew
- Tim Faraday as Black Martin
- Grant Stimpson as Morgante
- Mark Sumner as Conti
- Ross O'Hennessy as Commander Quattone
- Andrew Brooke as Grunwald
- Erik Madsen as Zircher
- Ian Pirie as Captain Dragonetti
- David Sterne as Blind Beggar
- Bill Thomas as Vespasiano da Bisticci
- Celyn Jones as Fabrizio
- Paul Westwood as Niccolo Ardinghelli
- Rowena Diamond as Harlot
- Julian Gillard as Forge Worker
- Scott Stevenson as Pazzi Nobleman
