= Da Vinci's Demons =

British-American drama television series

- Genre: Historical fantasy; Drama; Adventure
- Created by: David S. Goyer
- Starring: Tom Riley; Laura Haddock; Blake Ritson; Elliot Cowan; Lara Pulver; James Faulkner; Gregg Chillin
- Theme music composer: Bear McCreary
- Composer: Bear McCreary
- Countries of origin: United States; United Kingdom
- Original language: English
- No. of seasons: 3
- No. of episodes: 28

Production
- Executive producers: David S. Goyer; Julie Gardner; Jane Tranter; Brian Nelson; Lee Morris; Rose Lam
- Producers: Marco Ramirez; Matthew Bouch
- Production location: Wales
- Cinematography: Julian Court; Fabian Wagner
- Editors: Tim Murrell; Philip Kloss; John Richards; Nick Arthurs
- Camera setup: Multiple
- Running time: 46–56 minutes
- Production companies: Phantom Four Films; Adjacent Productions

Original release
- Network: Starz (United States); Fox (United Kingdom)
- Release: 12 April 2013 – 26 December 2015

Da Vinci's Demons is a historical drama television series that presents a fictional account of Leonardo da Vinci's early life. The series was conceived by David S. Goyer and stars Tom Riley in the title role. It was developed and produced in collaboration with BBC Worldwide and was shot in Wales. The series has been distributed to over 120 countries.

The show follows Leonardo as he is implicated in the political schemes of the Medici and Pazzi families and their contrasting relationships with the Catholic Church. These events occur alongside Leonardo's quest to obtain a mystical text called the Book of Leaves, which leads him to become entangled with a cult known as the Sons of Mithras.

The series premiered in the United States on Starz on 12 April 2013, and its second season premiered on 22 March 2014. The series was renewed for a third season, which premiered on 24 October 2015. On 23 July 2015, Starz announced that the third season would be the show's last. However, Goyer has left it open for a miniseries return.

== Plot ==
A fictionalised story based on historical persons, the series explores the early life of Leonardo da Vinci during the Renaissance in Italy. He is an eccentric genius who has struggled to deal with his inner demons and unruly imagination, as he yearns for acceptance from his estranged father. Their sometimes antagonistic relationship results in Leonardo's working for the House of Medici. While doing so, he becomes embroiled in a political scheme to control Florence, as he hunts for a spy who is revealing information to the Catholic Church and the Pazzi family. He also begins an affair with Lucrezia Donati, Lorenzo de' Medici's mistress. The series depicts many of Leonardo's inventions and subsequent works as a military engineer for the Duke of Milan and the Borgias.

These events coincide with Leonardo's quest to uncover the Book of Leaves, which a mysterious cult known as the Sons of Mithras also consider very important. Mystics and the cult guide him to unlock the 'hidden areas of his mind' by accessing the Fountain of Memory, and inform him that he has the power to see the future and also to shape it.

== Cast and characters ==
=== Main ===
- Tom Riley as Leonardo da Vinci
- Laura Haddock as Lucrezia Donati
- Blake Ritson as Count Girolamo Riario
- Elliot Cowan as Lorenzo de' Medici
- Lara Pulver as Clarice Orsini
- James Faulkner as Pope Sixtus IV – Francesco & Alessandro della Rovere (seasons 2–3; recurring season 1)
- Gregg Chillin as Zoroaster da Peretola (season 3; recurring seasons 1–2)

=== Recurring ===
- Hera Hilmar as Vanessa Moschella, outspoken Florentine barmaid and occasional model for Leonardo
- Eros Vlahos as Nico, apprentice to Leonardo
- David Schofield as Piero da Vinci, notary to Lorenzo and father to Leonardo
- Alexander Siddig as Aslan Al-Rahim, "The Turk"
- Tom Bateman as Giuliano de' Medici, brother to Lorenzo (seasons 1–2)
- Allan Corduner as Andrea Verrocchio (seasons 1–2)
- Michael Elwyn as Gentile Becchi (season 1)
- Michael Culkin as Jacopo Pazzi (seasons 1–2)
- Nick Dunning as Cardinal Lupo Mercuri, Curator of the Vatican Secret Archives
- Elliot Levey as Francesco de' Pazzi (seasons 1–2)
- Paul Rhys as Vlad Tepes (seasons 1, 3)
- Shaun Parkes as Solomon Ogbai, "The Abyssinian" (seasons 1–2)
- Vincent Riotta as Duke Federico da Montefeltro (seasons 1–2)
- Estella Daniels as Zita (supporting season 1; principal season 2)
- Carolina Guerra as Ima, High Priestess of the Children of the Sun (season 2)
- Ian Pirie as Captain Nazzareno Dragonetti (supporting season 1; principal seasons 2–3)
- Raoul Trujillo as the Sapa Inca (season 2)
- Kieran Bew as Alfonso, Duke of Calabria (seasons 2–3)
- Lee Boardman as Amerigo Vespucci (season 2)
- Matthew Marsh as Ferdinand I of Naples, "Ferrante" (season 2)
- Ray Fearon as Carlo de' Medici, illegitimate son of Cosimo de' Medici, "The Magician" (seasons 2–3)
- Richard Sammel as Hartweg (season 2)
- Jeany Spark as Ippolita Maria Sforza, Duchess of Calabria (season 2)
- Sasha Behar as The Seer / Caterina, Leonardo's mother (supporting season 2; principal season 3)
- Akin Gazi as Bayezid II (supporting season 2; principal season 3)
- Simone Lahbib as Laura Cereta (season 3)
- Paul Freeman as The Architect / Asterion (season 3)
- Jude Wright as Andrea da Vinci (dream-sequence) (season 3)
- Dafydd Emyr as Captain of the Labyrinth (dream-sequence) (season 3)
- Sabrina Bartlett as Sophia (season 3)

=== Guest and cameo ===
- Ross O'Hennessy as Commander Quattrone (seasons 1–2)
- David Sturzaker as Bernardo Baroncelli (season 1)
- Simon Armstrong as Scarpa (season 1)
- Hugh Bonneville as Galeazzo Maria Sforza (cameo season 1)
- Tom Wu as Quon Shan (season 2)
- Ieuan Rhys as Councilman De'Rossi (season 3)
- Paul Rhys as Vlad the Impaler (four episodes)
- Ruby Stokes as Amelia (two episodes)
- Porcelain Delaney as Handmaiden (one episode)

== Casting ==
Tom Riley was the first actor to be cast in the series, as The Hollywood Reporter announced he had landed the role of Leonardo da Vinci. Goyer and managing director Carmi Zlotnik revealed he was cast as he could portray the character with many dimensions that would appeal to a worldwide audience. They later reported that Laura Haddock had been cast in the female lead as Lucrezia Donati.

== Production ==
The series marks the first collaboration between Starz and BBC Worldwide, following a new production agreement. Fox International Channels picked up the series for global distribution. The show was created by Goyer, who directed the first two episodes and wrote several others along writers such as Scott Gimple, Brian Nelson and Joe Ahearne.

Filming for the series took place in the United Kingdom, at Swansea, Neath, Port Talbot and Margam Castle in Wales. A 265,000-square-foot (24,600 m^{2}) studio in Swansea Gate Business Park was also used and several sets were built to resemble 15th-century Florence. Annie Symons was brought on board as the lead costume designer. Bear McCreary composed the score for the series, and orchestrated the main theme to reflect Leonardo's use of mirror writing. Goyer had a scene in episode five depicting a kiss between Leonardo and Jacopo Saltarelli filmed in secret as he feared network interference.

Goyer revealed to USA Today at the New York Comic Con that season two would also be set in South America and would feature Machu Picchu and the Inca Empire. Goyer claimed that this was justified by "new research" that has revealed Chinese and European explorers may have arrived in the New World earlier than was originally believed.

=== Sexuality of Leonardo ===
There is widespread belief that Leonardo was primarily if not exclusively sexually attracted to and involved with men. Goyer acknowledged this and said that the show would not shy away from the subject. Riley cited that because the speculation exists it is something that should be honoured.

In a later interview with the gay-interest website The Backlot, Riley expressed his hope that "The Tower" episode would address concerns about the show's depiction of Leonardo's sexuality in a way that was satisfactory and respectful to any historical beliefs.

== Episodes ==
=== Series overview ===
Series	Episodes	Originally released	
Series	Episodes	First released	Last released
1	8	12 April 2013	7 June 2013
2	10	22 March 2014	31 May 2014
3	10	24 October 2015	26 December 2015

=== Season 1 (2013) ===
No. overall	No. in season	Title	Directed by	Written by	Original release date	US viewers (millions)
1	1	"The Hanged Man"	David S. Goyer	David S. Goyer	12 April 2013	1.042
Lorenzo Medici gives Leonardo the contract to paint his lover Lucrezia, and Leonardo takes the opportunity to sell him his designs of airplanes, automatic load cannons and tanks. At the Carnival, Leonardo's mechanical pigeon flies and he has a sexual encounter with a masked Lucrezia, who's later revealed to be an agent of Riario and the Vatican. She tells the Pope about the weapons Leonardo is planning for Lorenzo and about his encounter with the Turk.
2	2	"The Serpent"	David S. Goyer	David S. Goyer & Scott M. Gimple	19 April 2013	0.503
3	3	"The Prisoner"	Jamie Payne	Story by : Scott M. Gimple; Teleplay by : Scott M. Gimple and David S. Goyer	26 April 2013	0.382
The murder of Sforza has ended the alliance of Florence with Milan. da Vinci is serving as Lorenzo's war engineer. da Vinci discovers an ergot infection as the cause of demonic convulsions among nuns.
4	4	"The Magician"	Jamie Payne	David S. Goyer & Jami O'Brien	3 May 2013	0.419
The Florentine statutes criminalize sodomy; so, da Vinci is arrested on a sodomy accusation.
5	5	"The Tower"	Paul Wilmshurst	Joe Ahearne	10 May 2013	0.464
6	6	"The Devil"	Paul Wilmshurst	Brian Nelson & Marco Ramirez	17 May 2013	0.548
Federico da Montefeltro, the Duke of Urbino, is visiting Lorenzo de Medici. da Vinci travels to Wallachia where he meets Dracula. Dracula needs weapons to fight Sultan Mehmed II.
7	7	"The Hierophant"	Michael J. Bassett	Sarah Goldfinger & Corey Reed	31 May 2013	0.451
da Vinci meets Pope Sixtus IV in the Vatican Apostolic Archive. At the end of the episode, Lucrezia Donati stabs Giuliano de' Medici in a river.
8	8	"The Lovers"	Michael J. Bassett	Story by : David S. Goyer; Teleplay by : Brian Nelson & Corey Reed	7 June 2013	0.379
Francesco de' Pazzi wants to kill Lorenzo and Giuliano de' Medici. This final episode of this first season concludes with the Pazzi conspiracy inside a church in April 1478. The Pazzi family and their allies had Rome's Sixtus IV on their side.

=== Season 2 (2014) ===
No. overall	No. in season	Title	Directed by	Written by	Original release date	US viewers (millions)
9	1	"The Blood of Man"	Charles Sturridge	David S. Goyer & Corey Reed	22 March 2014	0.578
Leonardo helps the wounded Lorenzo to escape from the Pazzi, but Lorenzo is dying from loss of blood. With Verrocchio's help, Leonardo creates an improvised blood transfusion, giving his own blood to Lorenzo. While weakened during the transfusion, he has visions. While Lorenzo and Leonardo are incapacitated; so, da Vinci goes over the writings of Ibn al-Nafis to administer blood to Lorenzo. In the meantime, Riario and the Pazzi attempt to take over Florence. Clarice and her children barricade themselves in the Medici palazzo. Zoroaster and Lucrezia attempt to commandeer the Basilisk to find the Book of Leaves, but Riario captures them and takes the ship for himself.
10	2	"The Blood of Brothers"	Peter Hoar	Jami O'Brien	29 March 2014	0.391
Riario attempts to execute Zoroaster and Lucrezia by making them walk the plank while chained together, but they survive. Riario proceeds on his way to the Americas, while Leonardo attempts to help Lorenzo to regain control of Florence. He rigs up a form of amplifier using bells, so that Lorenzo can be heard in much of the city center. Lorenzo rallies the people to defend the republic and reject the attempt by the Pazzi and Ferante to take over Florence. With Lorenzo back in power, Leonardo says he must leave to find a ship to continue his search for the Book and his mother. Lorenzo gives his blessing, and, to signify their new bond, gives him the smaller of the two Medici longswords, cleverly hidden within the larger one by Cosimo. Da Vinci has a rendez-vous with Amerigo Vespucci.
11	3	"The Voyage of the Damned"	Peter Hoar	Brian Nelson	5 April 2014	0.408
Pretending to be Count Riario, Leonardo attempts to take over a ship, but Prince Alfonso of Naples, who knows Riario personally, exposes him. Leonardo and Zoroaster escape, but Alfonso takes the ship, which has a cargo of slaves. Leonardo invents a pedal-powered submarine in order to sneak under the ship unseen, while Amerigo Vespucci joins Alfonso on board. After nearly failing, Leonardo and Zoroaster get on board the ship with Amerigo's help. Lucrezia convinces Mercuri to enter the Castel Sant'Angelo to meet her father: the real Pope Sixtus IV. The false Sixtus seeks to isolate Florence by excommunicating the city.
12	4	"The Ends of the Earth"	Charles Sturridge	Marco Ramirez	12 April 2014	0.432
Crewed by liberated slaves, Leonardo's ship sails west. But the slaves are convinced they will fall off the edge of the world. Leonardo tries to prove to them that the world is round, but when his calculations of how the positions of the stars will shift turn out to be inaccurate, the slaves rebel. Leonardo realizes that his calculations would be corrected if the earth traveled round the sun, rather than the opposite. But it is too late to convince the slaves. In Rome, Lucrezia meets her father and convinces him to make her a partner in his plans. Lorenzo and Piero, meanwhile, are traveling incognito to try and convince Naples to switch sides. Flashbacks reveal how the false Pope replaced his brother, murdering Lucrezia's sister in the process and driving her on to revenge.
13	5	"The Sun and the Moon"	Jon Jones	Dan Hess & Corey Reed	19 April 2014	0.426
Leonardo and his men land on an unknown shore and find the wreckage of the Basilisk there. Amerigo decides to return to the ship to chart the newly discovered land, vowing to Leonardo to stay on the coast for three months. Meanwhile, in Naples, the captured Lorenzo and Piero bribe a guard for a meeting with Lorenzo's former lover, Duchess Ippolita, in the hope of meeting the King Alfonso II of Naples. Back at Florence, the Medici bank associates plot to displace Clarice as the bank's leader with the help of Carlo de' Medici, Cosimo's long-lost bastard son. Leonardo and his crew are captured by locals and are brought to Machu Picchu, where their arrival has been expected by a mysterious priestess, Ima. Back in Florence, Carlo turns the tables on the Bank associates and reinforces Clarice's position; that night, they give in to their attraction.
14	6	"The Rope of the Dead"	Jon Jones	David S. Goyer & Matt Fraction	26 April 2014	0.255
Leonardo and Riario have to survive a series of grueling tests before they can enter the Vault of Heaven. Leonardo is bitten by a poisoned snake, and Riario must find the antidote while being hunted by warriors. Ima has sex with the feverish Leonardo, who experiences a series of visions while drugged by the poison. In his dreams he sees his masterpiece, the Mona Lisa, and meets himself as an old man, who reveals that the enemy stalking Leonardo and the Sons of Mithras is known as the Labyrinth. Meanwhile in Naples, Lorenzo is also having to face a life-or-death trial. The deranged King Ferrante places Lorenzo on a gibbet with a hangman's rope round his neck. Lorenzo must kill a galloping horse tied to the other end of the rope with a single bow shot. If he fails, he will be hanged. On the road to Constantinople, Lucrezia encounters al-Rahim, who offers advice in the form of the ghost of Lucrezia's long-dead sister, Amelia.
15	7	"The Vault of Heaven"	Peter Hoar	Brian Nelson & Marco Ramirez	3 May 2014	0.340
Leonardo successfully solves all three puzzles of the Vault, but is betrayed by Ima, who says he must be sacrificed to save her people. From the vault, he hears his mother's voice. Clarice and Venessa are attacked in Florence, with Carlo narrowly saving the day. Lucrezia Donati, along with her bodyguard, meets with Bayezid II.
16	8	"The Fall from Heaven"	Peter Hoar	Jonathan Hickman & Corey Reed	10 May 2014	0.420
Leonardo and Riario are to be sacrificed by Sapa Inca; Zo and Nico are to be enslaved. However, they escape, and Leo takes the key to the vault back from Ima. They enter the vault, but instead of the Book, find a brazen head with Leonardo's mother's voice recorded in it. Using makeshift parachutes, they escape from the vault; Ima is devastated by the absence of the Book of Leaves. Leonardo and the others are picked up by Amerigo. Outside Constantinople, Lucrezia convinces the Sultan's son to visit the Pope in Rome, who promptly rejects his offer of peace and humiliates him. In Naples, Lorenzo is forced to surrender to King Ferrante and The Pope.
17	9	"The Enemies of Man"	Justin Molotnikov	Story by : Brian Nelson & Marco Ramirez; Teleplay by : Allison Moore & Marco Ramirez	17 May 2014	0.439
Returning to Florence to find it occupied by the Duke of Urbino, Leonardo joins forces with Carlo to free Clarice and liberate the city, but Carlo reveals himself to be an agent of the Labyrinth and kills Verrocchio. Meanwhile, Lucrezia is interrogated by the Sultan's soothsayer, who after learning the truth of Lucrezia's parentage explains that her father wants to start a war between Christendom and the Ottoman Empire. Riario, now wanting to follow the true Pope, asks for absolution, but the real Sixtus angrily rejects him. Later, in Naples, Ferrante is assassinated, thus putting Lorenzo at the Pope's mercy.
18	10	"The Sins of Daedalus"	Peter Hoar	Story by : Brian Nelson & Corey Reed; Teleplay by : Corey Reed & Marco Ramirez	31 May 2014	0.435
Leonardo, reeling from Carlo's betrayal, is healed by al-Rahim, who suggests that the Book of Leaves has been in Constantinople the whole time. Vanessa, to her shock, is placed in charge of the House of Medici when a distraught Clarice seemingly abandons the city. Nico's full name is finally revealed. Riario is found, tortured and turned by the Labyrinth. The Sultan's son Bayezid II returns to Italy with a large fleet seeking revenge, prompting Naples, Florence and Rome form an unlikely alliance when Lucrezia delivers an ultimatum from the Sultan demanding Otranto. Just as it looks like Leonardo might save the day again, a shocked Piero reveals that the Sultan's soothsayer is Leonardo's mother.

=== Season 3 (2015) ===
On 24 October 2015, Starz released the full third season of Da Vinci's Demons on-demand.

No. overall	No. in season	Title	Directed by	Written by	Original release date	US viewers (millions)
19	1	"Semper Infidelis (Always unfaithful)"	Peter Hoar	John Shiban	24 October 2015	0.238
Leonardo successfully sinks the Turkish warship holding his mother and the Ottoman prince, ostensibly sealing a natural bottleneck and blocking the Turks' route to attack Otranto. Otranto spends the night celebrating and savoring its apparent victory. The next day, the Turks unveil advanced technology and resume their attack with an overwhelming advantage. Duke Alfonso is killed and the city is occupied. Lorenzo, Leonardo, Piero, Zoroaster, and several other survivors manage to hide themselves in an abandoned building and are confronted with a fully functioning Turkish version of Leonardo's tank design.
20	2	"Abbadon"	Peter Hoar	Amy Berg	31 October 2015	0.250
Leonardo, Piero, Lorenzo, Zoroaster, and several other Italian survivors take shelter in a church. Leonardo encounters a vision of Al-Rahim, who confesses that he supplied the Turks with Leonardo's war machine designs. Leonardo and the rest of his party escape the church after Piero allows himself to be captured to buy them time. Vanessa attempts to gain influence over the members of Florence's republic in the power vacuum created by Lorenzo and Clarice's absence. Clarice heads to Rome to hunt Carlo de Medici. She has an altercation with a high-ranking member of the Labyrinth and manages to take him captive. Leonardo and company escape Otranto via a tunnel. Leonardo decides to return to Otranto to rescue his father despite Zoroaster's objections. Leonardo finds Piero in line for execution along with the rest of the captured Italians. Piero loudly praises Leonardo to the Turks while Leonardo listens hidden in some bushes. Piero is executed.
21	3	"Modus Operandi"	Alex Pillai	Jesse Alexander	7 November 2015	0.233
Clarice tortures the captured member of the Labyrinth. She is disrupted by a noise and finds her subordinate murdered in the other room. She encounters an unseen individual whom she recognizes. Leonardo decides to pledge his allegiance to Pope Sixtus to gain the funds necessary to build an arsenal of war machines to use against the Turks, which causes him and Zoroaster to have a falling out. Sixtus agrees to fund Leonardo under the condition that he assists Riario in solving the recent murder of a powerful cardinal. Zoroaster encounters Lucrezia smoking opium in a bar. Sixtus prepares to take a bath and finds Clarice's crucified body. Leonardo dissects Clarice's corpse and finds evidence that leads him to her hideout. Riario, under orders from the head of the Labyrinth (called "the Architect"), knocks Leonardo unconscious from behind and delivers him to Carlo. Carlo begins to torture Leonardo as part of the Labyrinth’s conversion ritual. Leonardo begins to hallucinate.
22	4	"The Labrys"	Alex Pillai	Will Pascoe	14 November 2015	0.231
Leonardo hallucinates a future life in which he has married Lucrezia and they have a son together. Back in reality, Riario attempts to persuade Carlo and the Architect that Leonardo is more valuable to the Labyrinth alive than dead. Leonardo's hallucination progresses. The Architect decides to administer a poison guaranteed to either convert Leonardo to the Labyrinth or kill him. Leonardo wakes up on the side of a road, having been rescued by Riario.
23	5	"Anima Venator (Soul Hunter)"	Mark Everest	Kevin McManus & Matthew McManus	21 November 2015	0.201
Leonardo and Zoroaster reconcile and return to Florence. Leonardo's mother is shown to still be alive. Lucrezia tracks down Lupo Mercuri in an attempt to gain information as to the whereabouts of the Book of Leaves. Upon discovering that he is keeping a group of young women prisoner underneath his house, Lucrezia is imprisoned alongside them. Lorenzo is revealed working in a Turkish forced labor camp. Leonardo experiments with improved explosives designed to counter the Turkish tanks, but is unable to damage a captured piece of Turkish armor. It is revealed that the armour has supernatural properties and connections to Vlad the Impaler. Late that night, Leonardo finds Captain Dragonetti murdered and chases down the killer, who is revealed to be Riario.
24	6	"Liberum Arbitrium (Free will)"	Mark Everest	Jennifer Yale	28 November 2015	0.191
Leonardo keeps Riario chained up in a building. Riario reveals that he no longer wishes to be part of the Labyrinth but believes he is evil beyond all possibility for redemption. Leonardo attempts to undo the Labyrinth’s brainwashing and Riario is possessed by a murderous alter-ego.
25	7	"Alis Volat Propriis (Flies by his own wings)"	Colin Teague	Liz Sagal	5 December 2015	0.102
Lorenzo returns to Florence, but is a changed man and refuses to let Florence join the war against the Turkish Caliphate in the 1481 Crusade. Leo is banished from Florence by Lorenzo, while Zoroaster and Nico join him to seek Vlad the Impaler. Lucrezia finds Leo's mother and a secret about her latest friend, Sophia, is discovered.
26	8	"La Confessione Della Macchina (The Confession of the Machine)"	Colin Teague	Jesse Alexander	12 December 2015	0.120
Leonardo returns to Vinci, and the special place he stumbled across as a boy. There he is greeted by Carlo. Riario confesses his murder of Clarice to Lorenzo. Nico and Zo are warmly greeted by Vlad. Sophia frees Leonardo who faces and defeats Carlo. Vlad challenges Zo to a special game of chess, with Nico's life on the line. Vlad reveals this to be a test of loyalty that Nico and Zo pass and the armor is revealed. Sophia (possible half-sister of Leonardo da Vinci) treats Leonardo for his wounds and attempts to read the Book of Leaves, which they realize must be read under moonlight so they return to the special place and discover some of its characteristics. In the moonlight, Sophia and Leonardo see very different perspectives of the page that combine into a weapon that is as powerful as it is uncontrolled. Vanessa Moschella offers Lorenzo intimacy.
27	9	"Angelus Iratissimus (The Most Wrathful Angel)"	Peter Hoar	Amy Berg	19 December 2015	0.120
Leonardo and Sophia struggle with focusing their weapon, a problem that Zo inadvertently resolves. Lorenzo and Vanessa continue their relations though Vanessa makes clear she is not to be bought. Sixtus absolves responsibility for Riario's fate in Florence as the trial is swiftly conducted and the sentence of death handed down. Vlad is introduced to Sixtus by Nico. Sophia reveals she easily decoded Leonardo's cipher and asks about his journal. Leonardo notes that he and Sophia are only half-siblings, her father likely being Aslan Al-Rahim. As Leonardo, Sophia and Zo reach the arranged meeting point informed by Vlad. But Zo and Sophia are caught.
28	10	"Ira Deorum (Wrath of the Gods)"	Peter Hoar	John Shiban	26 December 2015	0.202
As the final battle draws near, Lorenzo and Vanessa are becoming increasingly intimate. An imprisoned Lucrezia kills the Sultan′s son, enabling the escape of her, Sophia and Zo to complete Leonardo's plan. However, Lucrezia is killed by arrow in the process. At his planned hanging, Riario confesses to murdering Clarice, however talks his way out of being killed by swaying the crowd with his speech primed by The Architect. Leonardo draws the Turks into battle in an open field, where Vlad is killed by his brother, the Turkish Commander. On the brink of victory, the Turks are killed by an electrical field that is created by the completion of a circuit created by a kite that Lucrezia released before dying. Vlad is then shown to be undead. Riario returns to the Vatican where he kills his father, Sixtus, cuts the papal ring off Sixtus′ hand, puts it on and kisses it. Lorenzo recognizes the bastard child as his, making Vanessa happy and proclaiming his prosperous future. Leonardo and Zo head back to Florence with Sophia, while Nico stays in Naples to help with rebuilding. As a final line, Leonardo quoted Verrocchio to Zo: "People of accomplishment rarely sat back and let things happen to them. They went out and happened to things."

== Reception ==
Season 1 has received favourable reviews from critics. It holds a 75% approval rating on aggregate review site Rotten Tomatoes, based on 32 collected critic reviews, with an average score of 6.1/10. The sites consensus reads: "Despite its preposterous plotting and lack of historical accuracy, Da Vinci's Demons is energetic, enjoyable escapist television." It also holds a Metacritic score of 62 out of 100, based on 27 critics reviews, indicating "generally favorable reviews".

=== Accolades ===
Da Vinci's Demons received three nominations for Outstanding Main Title Design, Outstanding Main Title Theme Music and Outstanding Special Visual Effects at the 65th Primetime Creative Arts Emmy Awards. The series won Main Title Design and Main Title Theme Music, but lost Visual Effects to the Cinemax series Banshee.

== Home media ==
DVD
Title	No. of discs	Release date		
Title	No. of discs	Region 1	Region 2	Region 4
The Complete First Season	3	3 September 2013	31 March 2014	7 May 2014
The Complete Second Season	3 (UK/US) / 4 (AUS)	3 March 2015	13 April 2015	2 July 2014
The Complete Third Season	3 (UK/US) / 4 (AUS)	26 January 2018	26 January 2018	26 January 2018

Blu-ray
Title	No. of discs	Release date	
Title	No. of discs	Region A	Region B (UK)
The Complete First Season	3	3 September 2013	31 March 2014
The Complete Second Season	3	3 March 2015	31 August 2015
The Complete Third Season	3	26 January 2018	26 January 2018

== See also ==
- Cultural depictions of Leonardo da Vinci
- Leonardo, a 2011–2012 children's television series from the BBC
- Personal life of Leonardo da Vinci
