= Berardino Rota =

Italian Renaissance poet

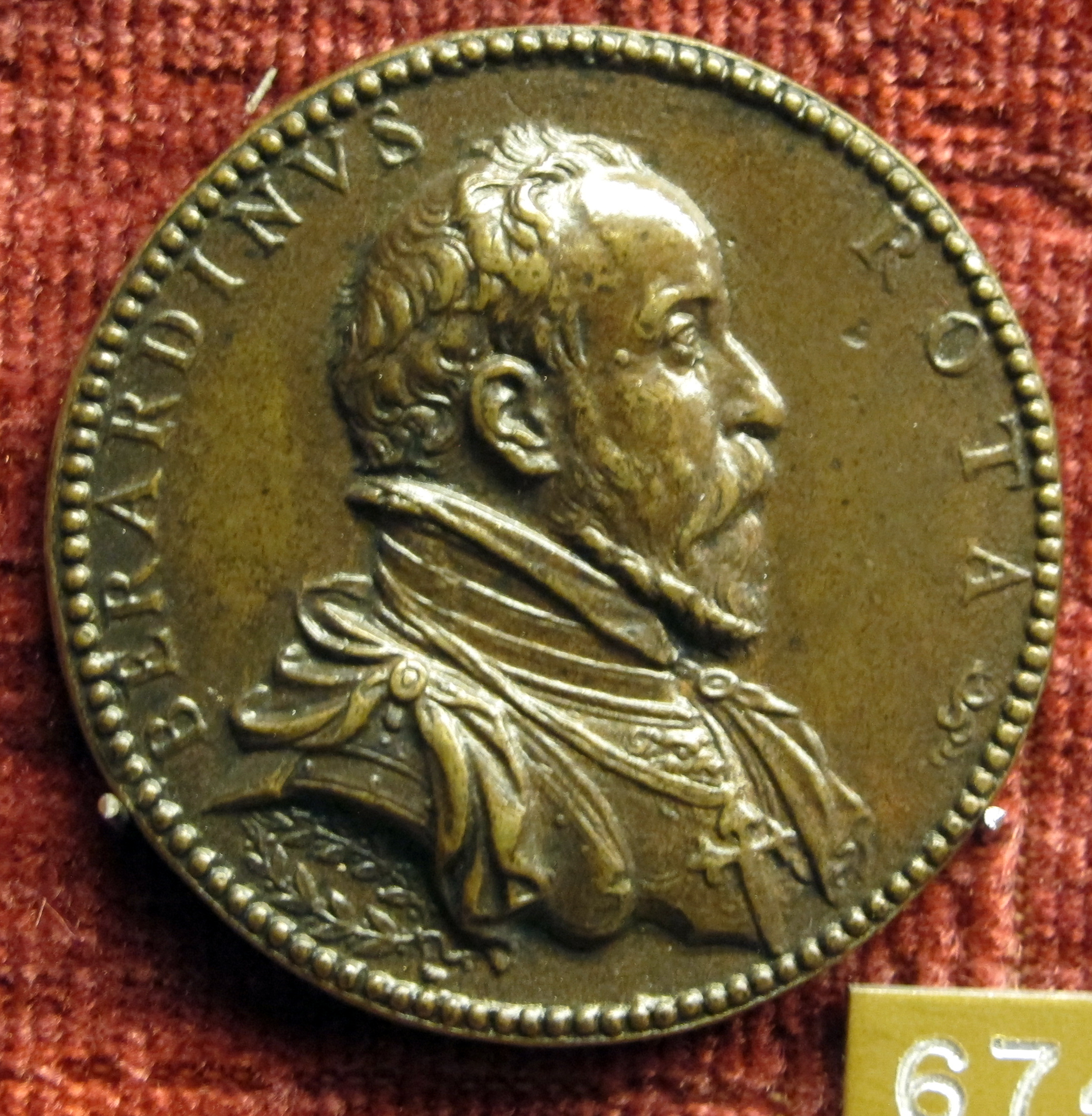
- Berardino Rota
- Born: 1509; Naples, Kingdom of Naples
- Died: 26 December 1574 (aged 64–65); Naples, Kingdom of Naples
- Resting place: San Domenico Maggiore
- Occupation: Poet
- Spouse: Porzia Capece (m. 1543; died 1559)
- Children: 7
- Writing career
- Language: Latin; Italian
- Period: 16th century; Renaissance
- Genres: Poetry
- Notable works: Egloghe pescatorie Sonetti in morte di Portia Capece
- Literary movement: Italian Renaissance

Berardino Rota (1509 – 26 December 1574) was an Italian Renaissance humanist and poet.

== Biography ==
Born to a wealthy and noble Neapolitan family, Rota was a disciple of Marcantonio Epicuro.

He was a leading figure in the literary life of the middle of the 16th century. He numbered among his friends Annibale Caro, Piero Vettori, and Paulus Manutius and was a member of Vittoria Colonna's literary circle. In 1543 he married Porzia Capece, the daughter of the head of the Accademia Pontaniana Scipione Capece. In 1546, Rota became a member of the Accademia dei Sereni in Naples. He was a knight of the Order of Santiago, and held the position of Secretary to the city of Naples. He died in Naples on 26 December 1574.

== Works ==
Together with Luigi Tansillo, Angelo di Costanzo, and Galeazzo di Tarsia, Rota was one of the most celebrated Neapolitan poets of his generation. He was a pivotal figure in the revival of Petrarchism in Naples.

Rota wrote both Italian and Latin poetry. He owes his fame mainly to a form of poetry that belongs peculiarly to Naples, the piscatorial eclogue. This form, which his countryman Sannazaro had invented and practised in Latin, Rota transferred to the vernacular. He composed his piscatorial eclogues about 1533; they were printed in 1560, 1566, 1567, and 1572. Rota was of the same generation as Della Casa, and one sees in his Eclogues a Latinisation of the style parallel to Della Casa's infusion of Horatian and Virgilian gravity into the sonnet.

Besides his eclogues, Rota composed a much praised collection of sonnets written on the death of his wife in 1559. These Sonetti et Canzoni were published with the poet's Ecloghe Pescatorie (separate title and pagination) at Naples in 1560.

Rota's Latin verse is singularly like his vernacular verse in character, and shows the same preoccupations. It consists of Elegies, Epigrams, and Sylvae, the last poem of the Sylvae being a lament for his wife. These poems were published in 1567. Scipione Ammirato dedicated to him his dialogue Il Rota overo delle imprese (1562).

== Bibliography ==
- Bullock, A. (2002). "Rota, Berardino". The Oxford Companion to Italian Literature. Oxford University Press. ISBN 978-0-19-818332-7.
- Milite, Luca (2017). "ROTA, Berardino". Dizionario Biografico degli Italiani (in Italian). Vol. 88: Robusti–Roverella. Rome: Istituto dell'Enciclopedia Italiana. ISBN 978-88-12-00032-6.
- Rosalba, Giovanni (1895). "Un poeta coniugale del secolo XVI". Giornale Storico della Letteratura Italiana. XXVI: 92–113.
- Rosalba, Giovanni (1899). "La famiglia di Berardino Rota". Studi di letteratura italiana. 1. Napoli: 160–179.
- Reforgiato, Vincenzo (1898). Le elegie e gli epigrammi latini di Berardino Rota. Catania.
- Hutton, James (1935). The Greek Anthology in Italy to the Year 1800. Ithaca: Cornell University Press. pp. 234–235, 312–313.
- Prince, Frank Templeton (1951). "Lycidas and the Tradition of the Italian Eclogue". English Miscellany: A Symposium of History, Literature, and the Arts. 2: 95–105.
- Berardino Rota (2000). Luca Milite (ed.). Rime. Scrittori italiani della Fondazione Pietro Bembo. Parma: Guanda.
