= Scipione (disambiguation) =

Scipione may refer to:

- Scipione (opera), opera by George Frideric Handel
- Scipione (painter) (1904–1933), name used by the Italian painter and writer Gino Bonichi
- Scipione (given name), Italian masculine given name

== See also ==
- Scipio (disambiguation)
