= Scipione (given name) =

Scipione is an Italian masculine given name. Notable people with this name include:

- Scipione Agnelli (1586–1653), Italian bishop, scholar and jurist
- Scipione Ammirato (1531–1601), Italian author, philosopher and historian
- Scipione Angelini (1661–1729), Italian painter
- Scipione Barbò Soncino, 16th-century Italian jurist and writer
- Scipione Bargagli (1540–1612), Italian philologist, academician and scholar
- Scipione Bongalli (1501–1564), Italian bishop
- Scipione Borghese (1577–1633), Italian cardinal, art collector, patron of the arts, and member of the Borghese family
- Scipione Borghese, 10th Prince of Sulmona (1871–1927), Italian aristocrat, industrialist, politician, explorer, mountain climber, racing driver, and member of the Borghese family
- Scipione Bozzuti (?–1591), Italian bishop
- Scipione Breislak (1748–1826), Italian geologist
- Scipione Capece (c.1480–1551), Italian jurist, humanist and poet
- Scipione Cappella (active 1743), Italian painter
- Scipione Chiaramonti (1565–1652), Italian philosopher
- Scipione Cignaroli (1715–1766), Italian painter
- Scipione Cobelluzzi (1564–1626), Italian cardinal, archivist and librarian
- Scipione Compagno (c.1624–aft.1680), Italian painter
- Scipione Dentice (1560–1633), Italian composer
- Scipione Dura (?–1551), Italian bishop
- Scipione Errico (1592–1670), Italian poet, writer, literary critic and academic
- Scipione del Ferro (1465–1526), Italian mathematician
- Scipione Gentili (1563–1616), Italian law professor and legal writer
- Scipione Gesualdo (?–1608), Italian archbishop
- Scipione Del Giudice (1888–1950), Italian rower
- Scipione Gonzaga (1542–1593), Italian cardinal and member of the Gonzaga family
- Scipione Guidi (1884–1966), Italian-American violinist
- Scipione Lacorcia (fl.1590–1620), Italian composer
- Scipione Lancelotti (1527–1598), Italian cardinal
- Scipione Pannocchieschi d'Elci (1598–1670), Italian cardinal and archbishop
- Scipione Pasquali (?–1624), Italian bishop
- Scipione Piattoli (1749–1809), Italian priest, educator, writer, and political activist
- Scipione Rebiba (1504–1577), Italian prelate of the Catholic Church
- Scipione de' Ricci (1741–1810), Italian bishop
- Scipione Riva-Rocci (1863–1937), Italian internist, pathologist and pediatrician
- Scipione Ronchetti (1846–1918), Italian politician
- Scipione Sacco (1495–1558), Italian painter
- Scipione Salernitano (?–1581), Italian bishop
- Scipione Spina (?–1639), Italian bishop
- Scipione Stella (1558/59–1622), Italian composer
- Scipione Tadolini (1822–1893), Italian sculptor
- Scipione Tecchi (1854–1915), Italian cardinal
- Scipione de Tolfa (?–1595), Italian bishop
- Scipione Vannutelli (1831–1894), Italian painter

== See also ==
- Andrew Scipione (born 1958), Commissioner of the New South Wales Police Force, Australia
