= Scipione Ammirato =

Italian historian and philosopher

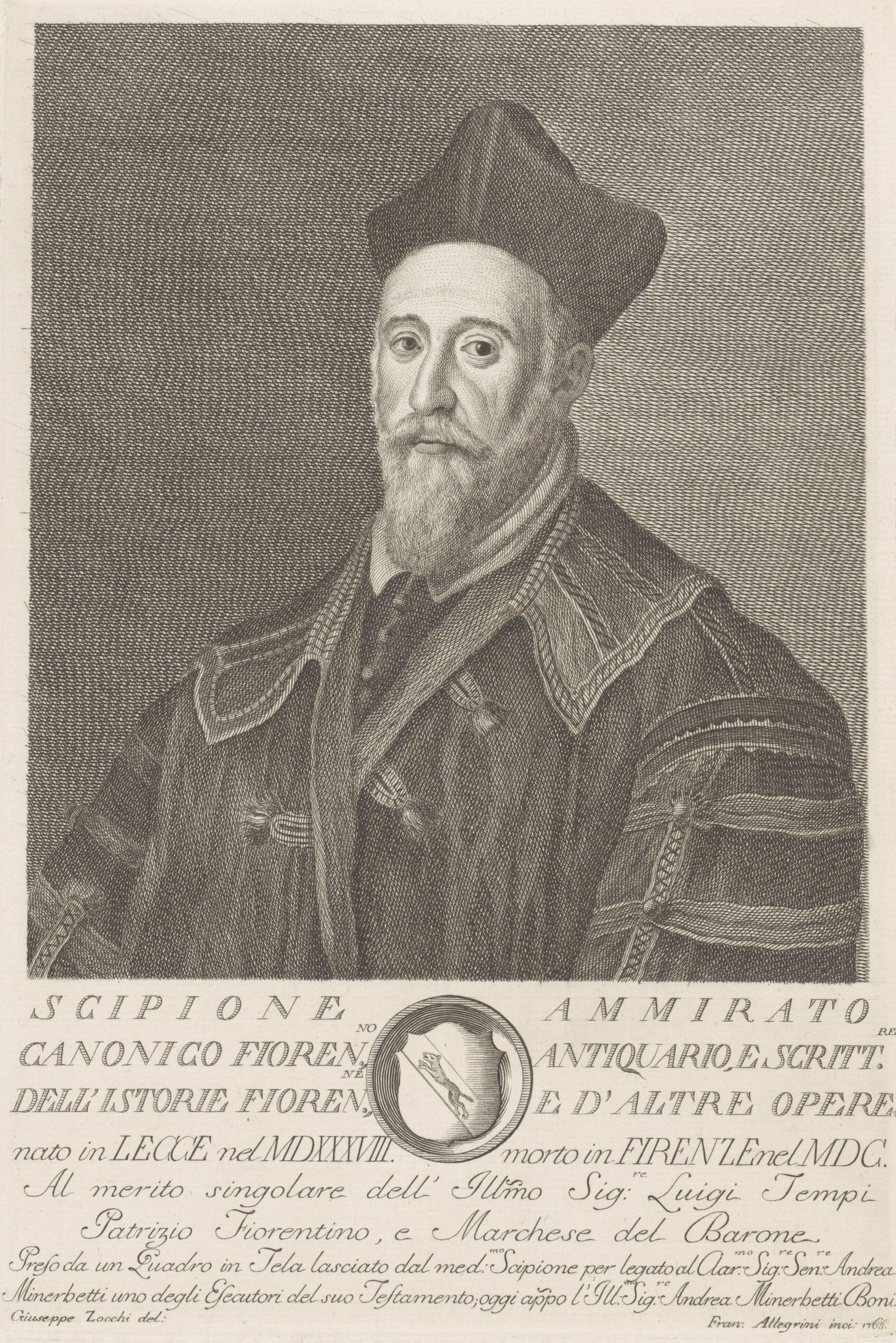
- Portrait of Scipione Ammirato engraved by Francesco Allegrini after Giuseppe Zocchi (1763)
- Born: 7 October 1531; Lecce, Kingdom of Naples
- Died: 11 January 1601 (aged 69); Florence, Grand Duchy of Tuscany
- Resting place: Florence Cathedral
- Occupations: Historian and philosopher

Philosophical work
- Era: Renaissance philosophy
- Region: Western philosophy; Italian philosophy
- Main interests: Politics and political philosophy, military theory, history
- Notable works: Discorsi sopra Cornelio Tacito; Istorie Fiorentine

Scipione Ammirato (Italian: [ʃiˈpjoːne ammiˈraːto]; 7 October 1531 – 11 January 1601) was an Italian author, philosopher and historian who lived during the Renaissance. He is regarded as an important figure in the history of political thought.

Ammirato's best-known work is the political treatise Discorsi sopra Cornelio Tacito (Discourses on Tacitus), published in 1594. The book soon became “an international classic” with numerous translations. In his Discorsi Ammirato presents himself as an anti-Machiavellian from the start, leaving no stone unturned in his efforts to confute the main theses of Il Principe. Unlike Botero and Lipsius, Ammirato did not see Tacitism as a surrogate form of Machiavellianism. On the contrary, his Discorsi present the works of the Roman historian as an antidote to Il Principe, and this approach was to prove widely popular during the long Tacitus revival.

Moreover, Ammirato's doctrine of reason of state defined such “reason” as violating neither natural nor divine law; it was the reason of the greater public good (such as public safety) and thus, in departing from the ordinary moral order in extraordinary circumstances, the modern prince did not come into conflict with Christianity.

== Biography ==
Scipione Ammirato was born at Lecce in the Kingdom of Naples in 1531, of a noble family of Florentine origin. In 1547, he was sent to Naples to study law, but he soon turned to literature instead. He devoted himself to the study of classical literature, to satisfy his interest in the ancient world. Ammirato attended literary clubs, striking up a friendship with the poet Berardino Rota, the historian Angelo di Costanzo and the polymath Bartolomeo Maranta.

In 1551 he received the minor orders from the Bishop of Lecce Braccio Martelli, who appointed him a canon of Lecce Cathedral. He afterwards travelled about Italy in quest of occupation; he resided some time at Rome, Padua and Venice, where he became secretary to Alessandro Contarini, a Venetian patrician, and became acquainted with Sperone Speroni, Vittoria Colonna, and Pietro Aretino. He contributed the Argomenti dei canti to the edition of Ludovico Ariosto's Orlando Furioso published in 1556 by Vincenzo Valgrisi, with the collaboration of Girolamo Ruscelli. He was forced to hurriedly abandon the city on account of the discovery of his love affair with a member of the Contarini family. He took refuge in his native Lecce where in 1558 he founded the Accademia dei Trasformati.

In his native country Ammirato was temporarily employed by several noblemen, and was sent by the Archbishop of Naples on a mission to Pope Pius V. It was a flourishing period in the history of papal Rome. Sixtus V was about to initiate “a program of urban development without parallel in any other European city.” Intellectual life was lively and characterized by a “new humanism.” There Ammirato associated with the humanist Giovanni Pietro Maffei, the philosopher Franciscus Patricius, and the Piedmontese political writer Giovanni Botero. He entered the patronage network of the reforming churchman Girolamo Seripando, to whom he dedicated the philosophical dialogue Il Dedalione o ver del poeta.

Ammirato then went initially to Naples but was not supported by the Spanish who refused to appoint him official historian of the viceroyalty. In 1569 he fixed his residence at Florence, where the Grand Duke Cosimo I offered him a position as state historiographer at the respectable salary of 300 scudi a year, and Cardinal Ferdinando de' Medici gave him the use of his own country house at La Petraia. Ammirato became a member of the Florentine Accademia degli Alterati, under the pseudonym Il Trasformato (“The Transformed”). In 1583, Bernardo Davanzati submitted to the academy the first book of his translation of the Annals, drawing Ammirato's attention to the works of Tacitus. In 1595 he was made canon of the Cathedral of Florence. He died in Florence in 1601. At his death, he made his secretary, Cristoforo del Bianco, his heir on condition that del Bianco should adopt the name of Ammirato. Accordingly, he is known as Scipione Ammirato the younger. Several of Ammirato's works were edited after his death by del Bianco.

== Major works ==
=== Discorsi sopra Cornelio Tacito ===
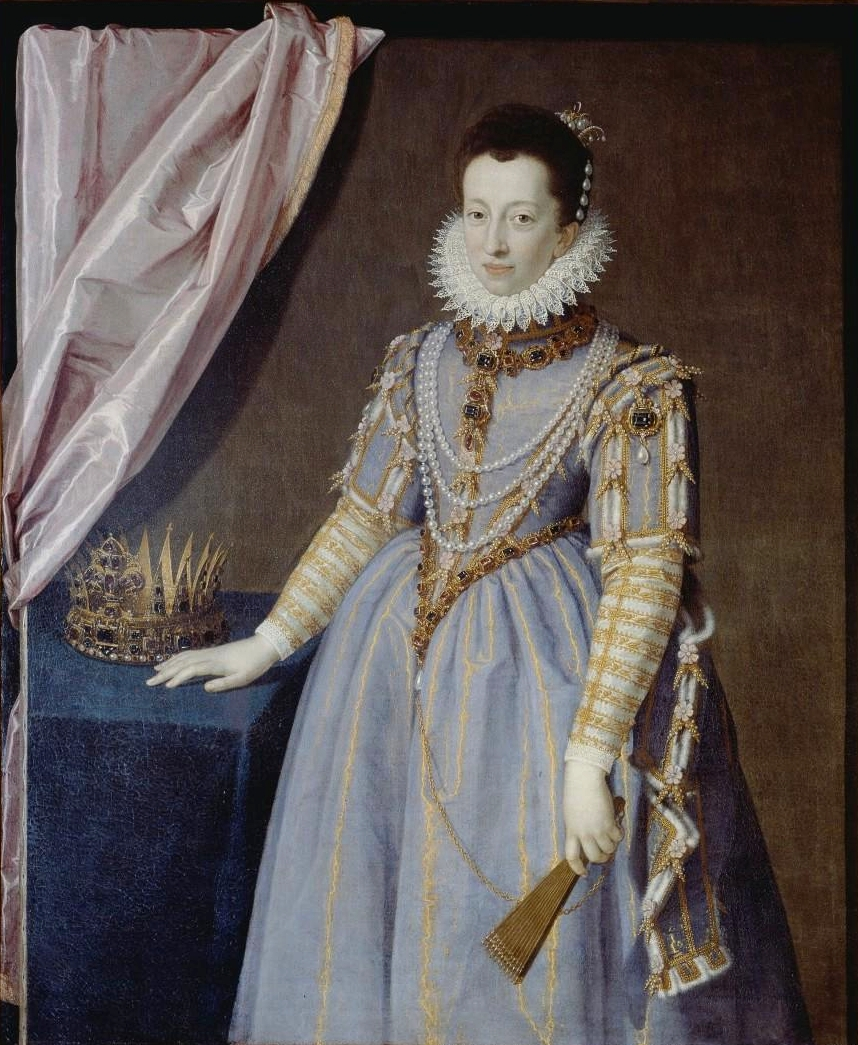
Grand Duchess Christina of Lorraine, to whom the Discorsi sopra Cornelio Tacito were dedicated

Ammirato invoked Tacitus to refute Machiavelli's secular republicanism and composed his Discorsi as a counter to Machiavelli's Discourses on Livy. Although Machiavelli is never mentioned by name in the Discorsi of Ammirato, his works are discussed in many passages. Machiavelli is always referred to vaguely (“altri,” “l'autor presupposto,” etc.), even when an exact citation of his work is provided in the margin. Ammirato blames Machiavelli for having subjugated the Christian religion to the demands of the State. Rather than adjust religion to fit themselves, he writes, men, and especially princes, must adjust laws to fit religion, «since in the nature of men in the fields and the caverns, before cities were built, there was a belief in God sooner than there were civil gatherings, on behalf of which laws were made; because it would not otherwise be necessary to say that religion should accommodate to civil life, than who might say that seasons of the year should change to fit individuals rather than the other way round.»

Ammirato defines the reason of state as:

an act contrary to ordinary reason committed for the public good, that is to say, on behalf of a higher and more universal reason.

— Discorsi del signor Scipione Ammirato sopra Cornelio Tacito, Florence, Giunti, p. 231

The reason of state should always have the good of the public as its aim and have to be compatible with religion. Ammirato accepted the derogation from the dictates of natural and positive law only when the preservation of the state was at stake, but rejected as a sign of tyranny any infringement of laws on the grounds of desire for glory or private interest. Ammirato made it clear, however, that though reason of state might authorize a ruler to set aside positive law, it did not permit him to act in violation of divine law.

The work is notable for its "Tacitean" style, concise to the point of obscurity. Ammirato intermixes modern examples with ancient ones, to make it clear, as he says in one of his Discorsi, that the truth of things is not changed by the difference of times.

Ammirato's Discorsi sopra Cornelio Tacito went through four Italian editions before 1599 and two more at the beginning of the next century. They were translated into Latin for the benefit of German readers in 1609 and 1618 and appeared in French translations twice in 1618 and in 1628, 1633, and 1642. In 1612 French royal geographer and humanist Antoine de Laval recapitulated Ammirato's arguments in his Dessein des problèmes politiques. Abraham Nicolas Amelot de la Houssaye considered Ammirato's commentary "unquestionably one of the best that we have upon Tacitus". Ammirato was widely read in England. Thomas Hobbes was surely acquainted with his work, and Thomas Gordon's commentaries on Tacitus owed much to the work of Malvezzi, Ammirato and Alamos de Barrientos.

=== Istorie Fiorentine ===
The Istorie Fiorentine, were published in two parts. Books I-XX (from the foundation of the city up to 1434, when Rinaldo degli Albizzi was exiled and Cosimo de' Medici invited to return) were printed in Florence in 1600; Books XXI-XXXV (up to 1574, the year in which Ammirato's patron Cosimo I died) were published posthumously in 1641 by Scipione Ammirato the younger, and dedicated to the Grand Duke Ferdinando II. In 1647 Scipione Ammirato the younger published a second and improved edition of the first part, with additions, in 2 vols. fol. The Istorie may not be a great imaginative work, but it is securely based on original archive sources, many of which had been previously inaccessible. It is widely considered “a far more complete and comprehensive history of Florence than any which existed in his own day”, and was greatly praised by Tiraboschi. Ammirato, was highly critical of Machiavelli's Florentine Histories and accused the Florentine secretary of having «altered names, twisted facts, confounded cases, increased, added, subtracted, diminished and did anything that suited his fancy without checking, without lawful restraint and what is more, he seems to have done so occasionally on purpose.»

== Works ==
=== Political and historical works ===
- Ammirato, Scipione (1594). Discorsi sopra Cornelio Tacito. Florence: per Filippo Giunti.
- Ammirato, Scipione (1598). Orazioni a diversi Principi intorno a' Preparamenti che s'avrebbero a fare contro la Potenza del Turco. Florence: per Filippo Giunti.
- Istorie fiorentine. Vol. 1. Florence: Filippo Giunti. 1600.
- Istorie fiorentine. Vol. 2. Florence: nella stamperia nuoua d'Amador Massi, e Lorenzo Landi. Con licenza de' superiori. 1641.
- Ammirato, Scipione (1637). I Vescovi di Fiesole di Volterra e d'Arezzo, con l'Aggiunta di Scipione Ammirato il Giovane. Florence: Amadore Massi. These are biographical notices of the bishops of those three sees.

=== Genealogical works ===
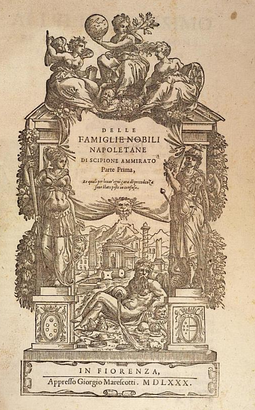
Scipione Ammirato, Delle famiglie nobili napoletane, Volume 1, 1580

- Delle Famiglie Nobili Napoletane, a genealogical work in two parts, folio, the first of which was published in 1580, and the second in 1651, after the author's death.
- Delle Famiglie nobili Fiorentine, completed and published in 1615 by Scipione Ammirato the younger, in fol.
- Albero e Storia dei Guidi coll'Aggiunte di Scipione Ammirato il Giovane, fol. 1640, and again, with additions, in 1650. The Guidi were a prominent aristocratic family that played an important role in the history medieval Florence;
- Discorsi delle Famiglie Paladina e Antoglietta, 1595. Ammirato was a careful and accurate genealogist, and his works on these subjects are based on thorough historical research. He examined fifty thousand archival documents for his work on the Neapolitan families, and six thousand for those of Florence.

=== Literary works ===
- Il Rota ovvero delle Imprese, 1562; a treatise upon the heraldic devices, in the form of a dialogue between prominent Neapolitan intellectuals. It is named in honour of one its interlocutors, Berardino Rota, a distinguished humanist and poet and a close friend of Ammirato's.
- Rime spirituali sopra i Salmi, Venice, 1634.
- Opuscoli, a collection of his minor works, in 3 vols, 1637–1642. They contain orations addressed to several princes and popes, biographies of King Ladislaus and his sister Joanna II of Naples, and of several distinguished members of house of Medici; treatises, short poems, and dialogues. Most important among them is the dialogue Dedalione, published in the third volume of the Opuscoli (1642), in which the seer Tiresias answers the objections raised by Daedalion against poetry, basing his argument on certain passages in Plato.

Ammirato left several manuscript works, among others a continuation of the Monte Cassino Chronicle, and his own autobiography, which is kept in the library of Santa Maria la Nuova of Florence.

== See also ==
- Francesco Guicciardini
- Niccolò Machiavelli
- Classical republicanism
- Italian Renaissance
