= Monte Cassino Chronicle =

Monte Cassino Chronicle may refer to:

- Chronicon monasterii Casinensis, chronicle of Monte Cassino from c. 529 until 1138, written by:
  - Leo of Ostia (1046–c.1116)
  - Peter the Deacon (fl. 1115–1131)
- Historia belli sacri, chronicle of the First Crusade and its aftermath from 1095 until 1131
