= Caterina di Meo Lippi =

Mother of Leonardo da Vinci

Caterina di Meo Lippi (c. 1436 – July 1493) is commonly identified as the mother of Italian polymath Leonardo da Vinci. Little is known about Caterina's life and she has been the subject of scholarly debate. While some scholars believe that Caterina was an Arab or Chinese slave, a book published by Martin Kemp and the archival researcher Giuseppe Pallanti says that Caterina was born in 1436 to a poor farmer, was orphaned at the age of 14 and gave birth to Leonardo da Vinci at the age of 16. According to the book Caterina later had five more children with a different man.

== Biography ==
According to the art historian Martin Kemp and the archival researcher Giuseppe Pallanti's book Mona Lisa: The People and the Painting, Caterina was born in 1436 to a poor farmer and became an orphan at age 14 after both of her parents died. She and her infant brother Papo moved into her grandmother's farmhouse in the hamlet of Mattoni, within a kilometre (less than a mile) of Vinci. Her grandmother died in 1451, causing Caterina to have to look after herself and her younger brother. After the 24-year-old notary Ser Piero da Vinci, originally from Vinci but working in Florence, visited Vinci, Caterina became pregnant with Leonardo in July 1451 and gave birth to him at age 16. Ser Piero and Caterina did not marry. Piero married a woman named Albiera eight months after Leonardo's birth, although this marriage was probably arranged before Leonardo was born. Piero helped arrange a marriage for Caterina, with the farmer and kiln worker Antonio di Piero del Vacca, who was often referred to as Accattabriga, translating to "troublemaker", though Walter Isaacson's biography of Leonardo notes that "he does not seem to have been one". Caterina and Accattabriga later had five more children together, four girls and one boy.

Caterina's husband, Accattabriga, died in about 1490, and around the same year, their son died after being shot by a crossbow. In July 1493 Caterina began living with Leonardo in Milan, but she died later that month, of malaria according to a record from the time. Leonardo recorded in his notebooks that the funeral and burial cost 123 soldi.

== Scholarship ==
The identity of "Caterina" has been subject to extensive research and her true identity is not known with any certainty. Some researchers believed that she was an Arab or Chinese slave and was in her mid-twenties when she gave birth to Leonardo da Vinci. Some others believe that Caterina di Meo Lippi was not Leonardo's mother, but instead a servant. Her name was not mentioned in records about Leonardo's birth or baptism, but her first name, Caterina, is mentioned in a tax record five years after the birth. In 2017 the art historian Martin Kemp and the researcher Giuseppe Pallanti released a book with new information about Caterina's life which theorised that Leonardo's mother was Caterina di Meo Lippi, who was not a slave. In 2023, the Leonardo scholar Carlo Vecce published the historical novel Il Sorriso di Caterina ['Caterina's Smile'] which conjectures that Leonardo's mother was a slave from the Caucasus region. Vecce's evidence was a document signed by Leonardo's father a few months after he was born, in which a slave named Caterina was freed from her mistress. In response Kemp said "I still favour our 'rural' mother, who is a better fit, not least as the future wife of a local 'farmer'". Kemp said that slaves who had converted to Christianity were commonly named Caterina and said that Francesco del Giocondo, who probably commissioned the Mona Lisa, traded two slaves named Caterina in one year.
