= Lucrezia Donati =

Italian noblewoman and mistress of Lorenzo de' Medici

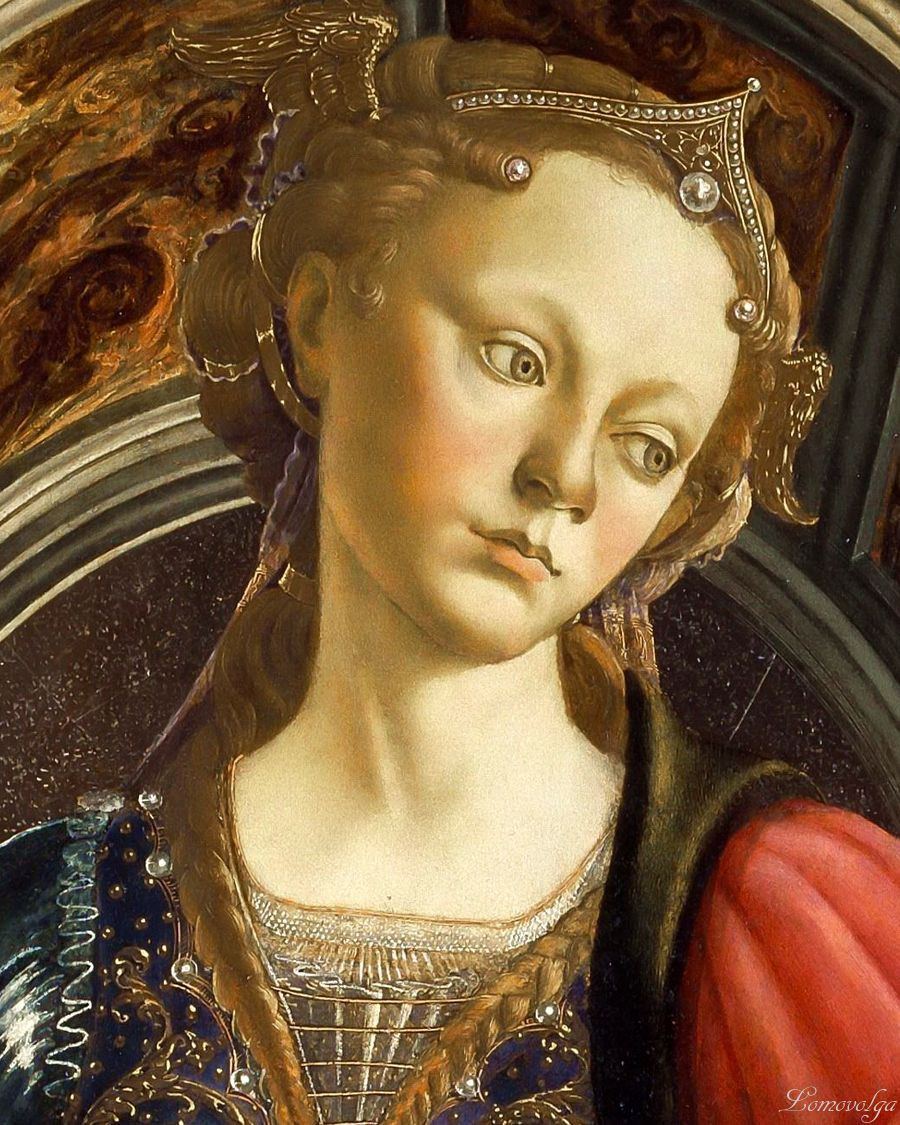
- Detail of the head of the painting Fortitude, by Sandro Botticelli. It is hypothesized that the painting was inspired by Lucrezia.

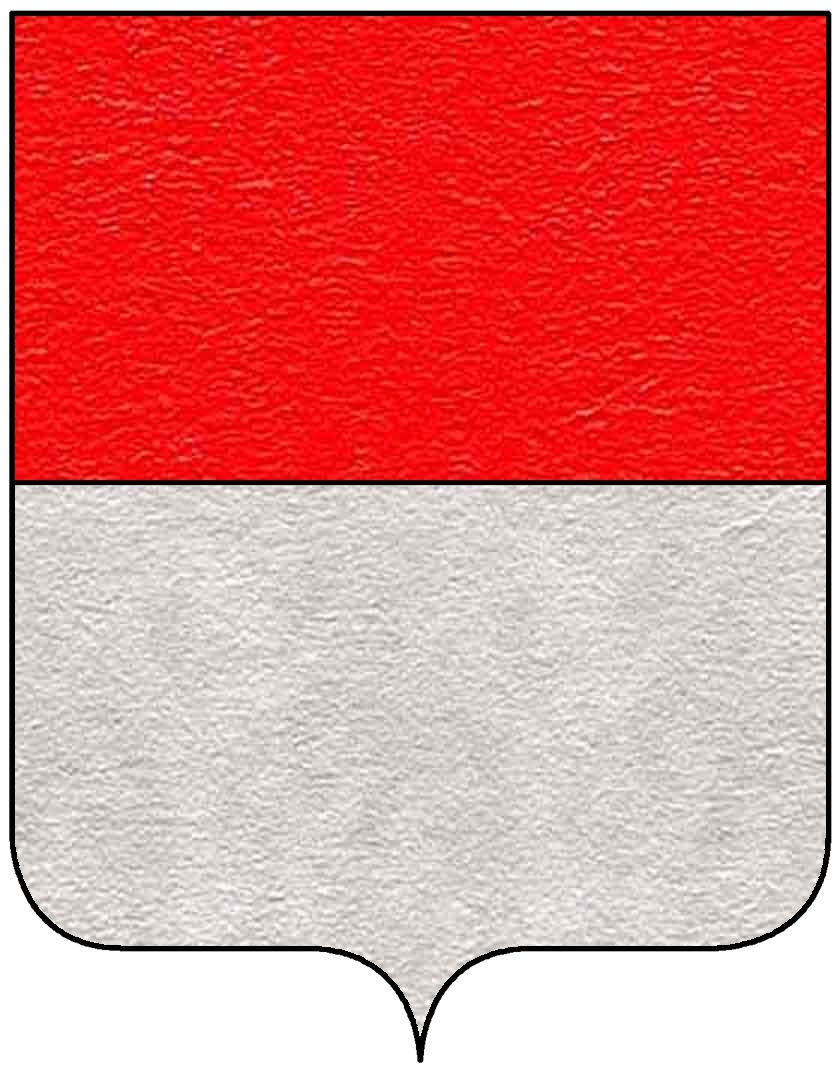
- Coat of arms
- Born: 1447; Florence, Italy
- Died: 1501 (aged 53–54); Florence, Italy
- Spouse: Niccolò Ardighelli
- Father: Manno Donati
- Mother: Caterina Bardi

Lucrezia Donati (Florence, Italy, 1447–1501) was an Italian noblewoman, and mistress of Lorenzo de' Medici.

The identity of the woman in the sculpture Dama col mazzolino, at Bargello Museum in Florence has been attributed by some to Lucrezia Donati. Also Sandro Botticelli's painting Fortitude would be another representation of her.

== Biography ==
Lucrezia was the daughter of Manno Donati and Caterina Bardi, a Florentine dame who belonged to a family tree of which she became the last descendant.

From 1461 she was the mistress of Lorenzo il Magnifico, a platonic love affair, until Lorenzo later married the Italian noble Clarice Orsini in 1469. In 1486 Lorenzo remembered the poems he had written for her when he was 16 in the poem Corinto.

Lucrezia married the Florentian businessman Niccolò Ardighelli, who died in exile in 1496.

== Popular culture ==
The actress Laura Haddock starred as Lucrezia Donati in the television series Da Vinci's Demons. Alessandra Mastronardi played Lucrezia in Medici: The Magnificent.

== Bibliography ==
- Vannucci, Marcello (1999). Le donne di casa Medici (in Italian). Rome: Newton Compton Editori. ISBN 88-541-0526-0.
- Nifosì, Giuseppe (2016). Arte in opera. Dal Rinascimento al Manierismo: Pittura Scultura Architettura. Vol. 3. Gius.Laterza & Figli Spa. p. 480. ISBN 9788842114321.
