= Eros Vlahos =

English actor and comedian (born 1995)

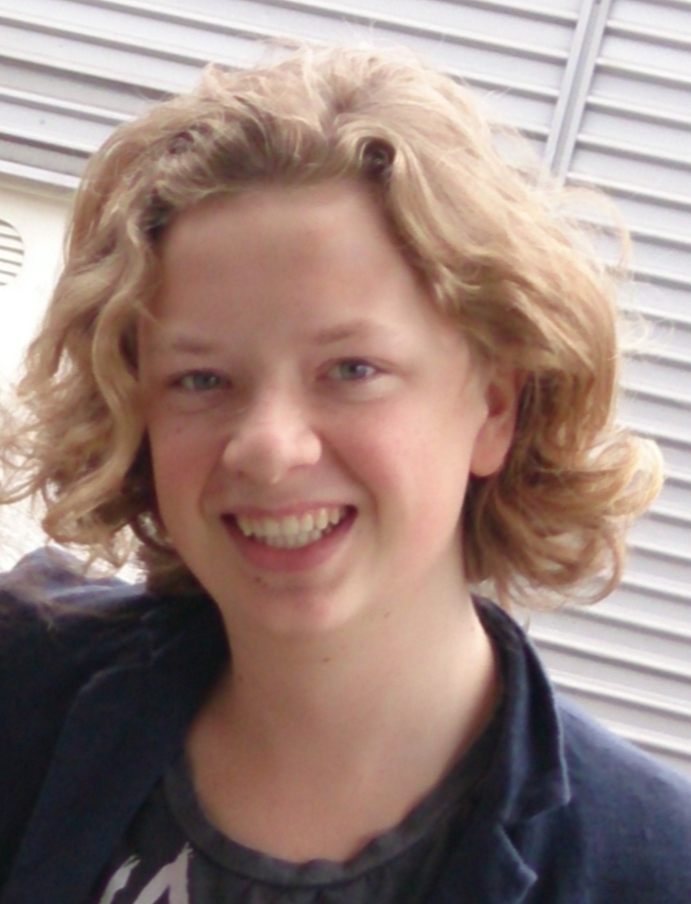
- Vlahos in 2013
- Born: 13 January 1995 (age 30); London, England
- Occupations: Actor, comedian
- Years active: 2007–present

Eros Vlahos (born 13 January 1995) is an English actor and comedian. He is known for his roles as Cyril Gray in Nanny McPhee and the Big Bang (2010), Jake Farley in Summer in Transylvania (2010), and Lommy Greenhands in Game of Thrones. He also appeared in a recurring role on the television series Da Vinci's Demons, as Nico Machiavelli (2013–2015).

== Family background and personal life ==
Eros Vlahos was born in London on 13 January 1995. His parents are Terry Davy (mother) and Spiros Vlahos (father), and he has a younger brother, Tron Vlahos. He is of British (maternal) and Greek (paternal) ancestry.

Vlahos' parents work in commercial partnership together, they own and operate the Cyberdog shop in Camden Market; a fashion, accessory, and toy retailer they founded together in 1994.

== Career ==
=== Filmography ===
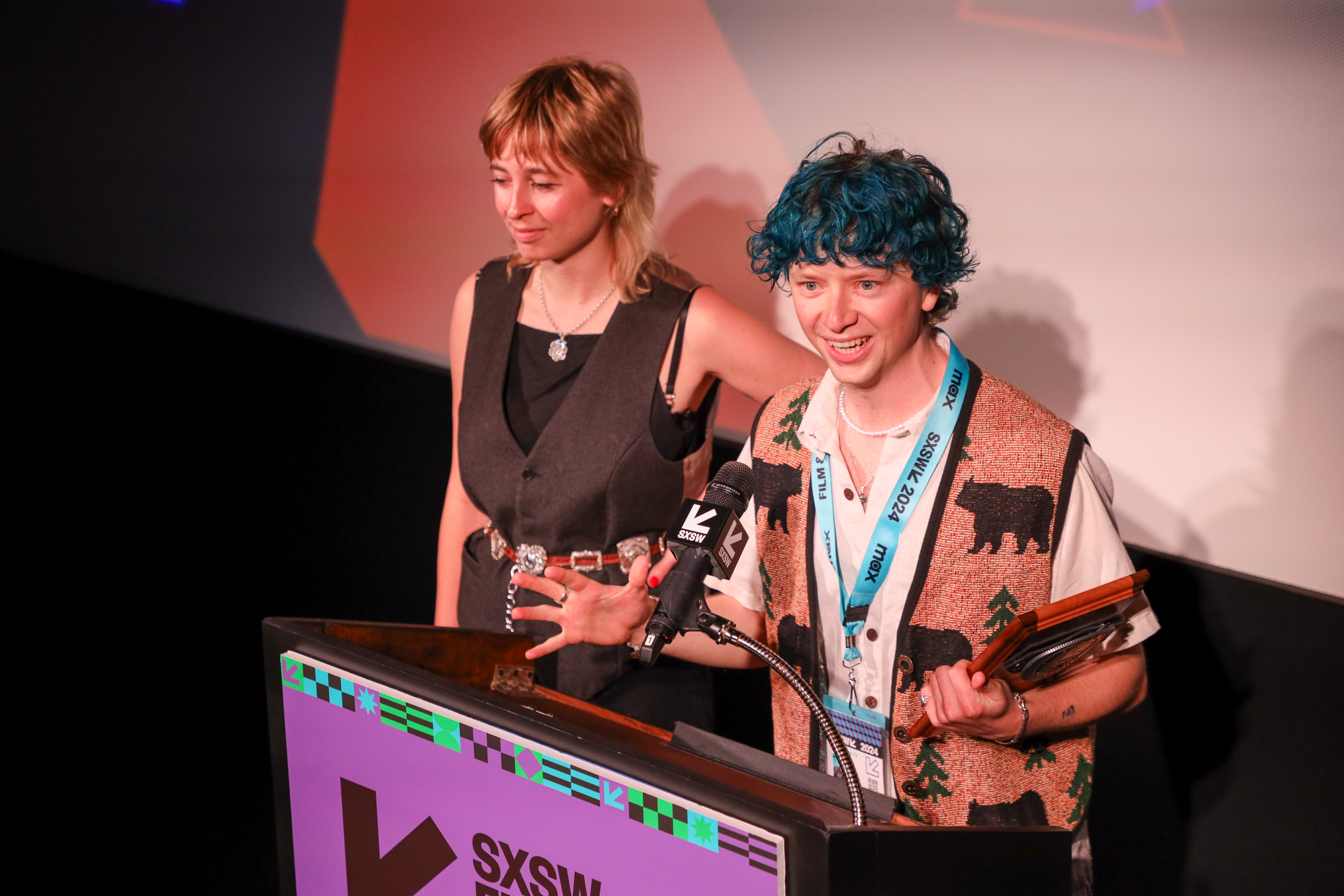
Vlahos at South by Southwest 2024 receiving the Midnight Shorts Competition Special Jury Award for the film Meat Puppet

Year	Title	Role	Notes
2007	Casualty	Liam Hendricks	Episode: "Snowball"
2009	Skellig	Coot	
2010	Nanny McPhee and the Big Bang	Cyril Gray	
2010	Third Star	Angel Boy	
2010	Summer in Transylvania	Jake Farley	4 episodes
2011	Episodes	'Pucks!' Boy	3 episodes
2011	Outnumbered	Marcus	Episode: "The Parent's Evening"
2011	Great Expectations	Young Herbert Pocket	Episode #1.1
2011–2012	Game of Thrones	Lommy Greenhands	4 episodes
2012	Anna Karenina	Boris	
2013–2015	Da Vinci's Demons	Nico Machiavelli	27 episodes
2018	Old Boys	Johnson	
2023	Extraordinary	Gordon	3 episodes

=== Other ===
In the summer of 2008, at the age of 13, Vlahos wrote and performed his own material at the Edinburgh Festival Fringe. In December of that year, he was recruited to review Christmas pantomimes for The Guardian newspaper and website. He also had a comedy show on Radio London and has appeared on CBBC Extra. He has been involved with the "Comedy Club 4 Kids UK" children's Comedy Academy. Vlahos directed the second series of the BBC Three comedy Juice.
