= Tommaso Masini =

Italian metallurgist and alchemist

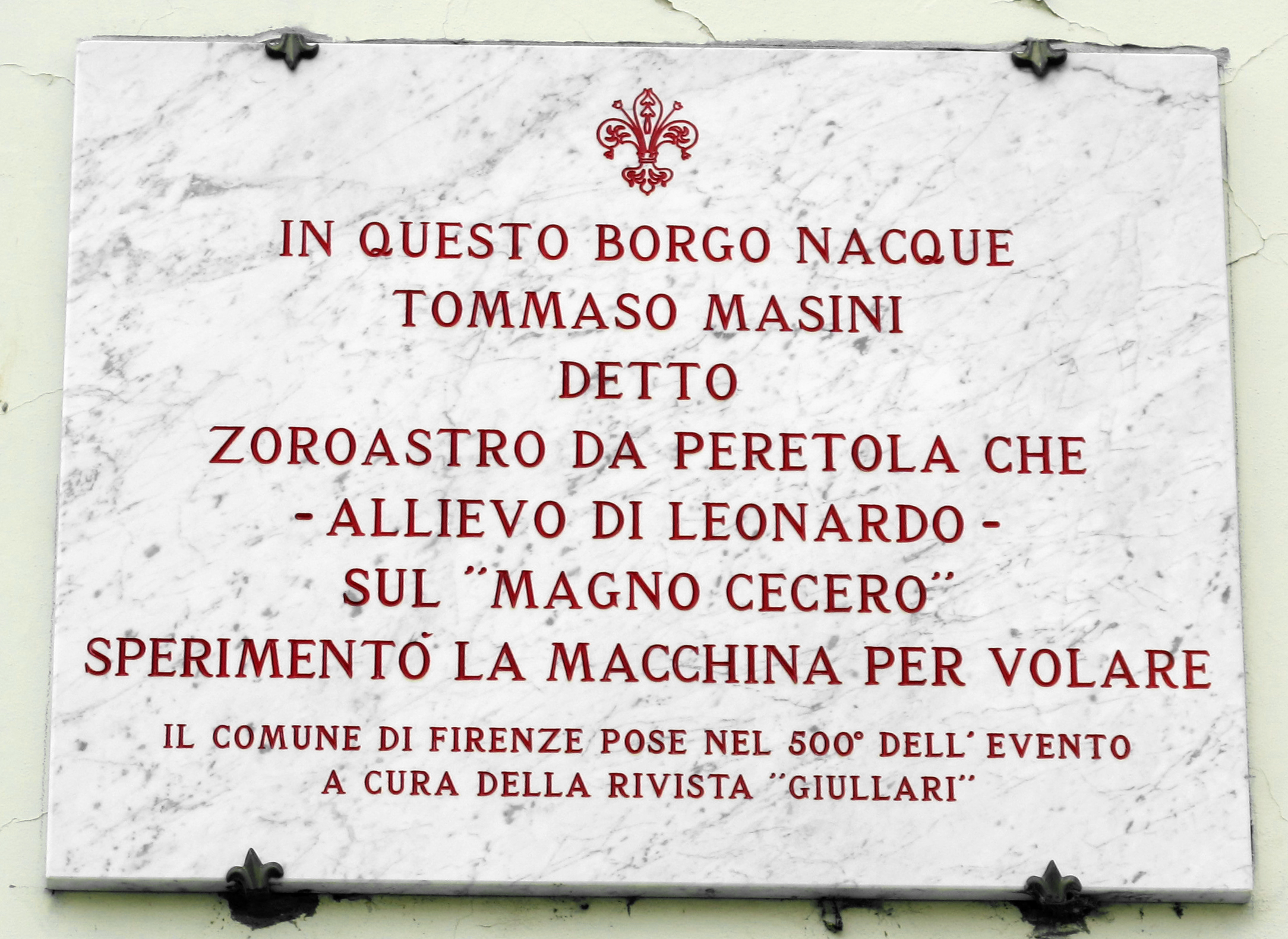
- Born: Tommaso di Giovanni Masini; 1462; Peretola
- Died: 1520 (aged 58); Rome, Italy
- Burial place: Church of Sant'Agata dei Goti

Tommaso di Giovanni Masini (c. 1462 – 1520), known as Zoroastro da Peretola, was a friend and collaborator of Leonardo da Vinci.

According to Scipione Ammirato, he was born in Peretola, near Florence, and he was the child of a gardener, although he said he was the illegitimate child of Bernardo Rucellai, Lorenzo il Magnifico's brother-in-law.

Masini was a mechanic, goldsmith, self-styled magician, astrologer, and alchemist. He sometimes mixed paints for Leonardo. Also according to Scipione Ammirato, like his friend Leonardo, Masini had an aversion to killing living things "He would not kill a flea for any reason whatever; he preferred to dress in linen so as not to wear something dead."

In 1505 he returned to Florence and worked with Leonardo in The Battle of Anghiari.

He was buried at the Church of Sant'Agata dei Goti.
