= Angelo di Costanzo =

Italian poet and historian (1507–1591)

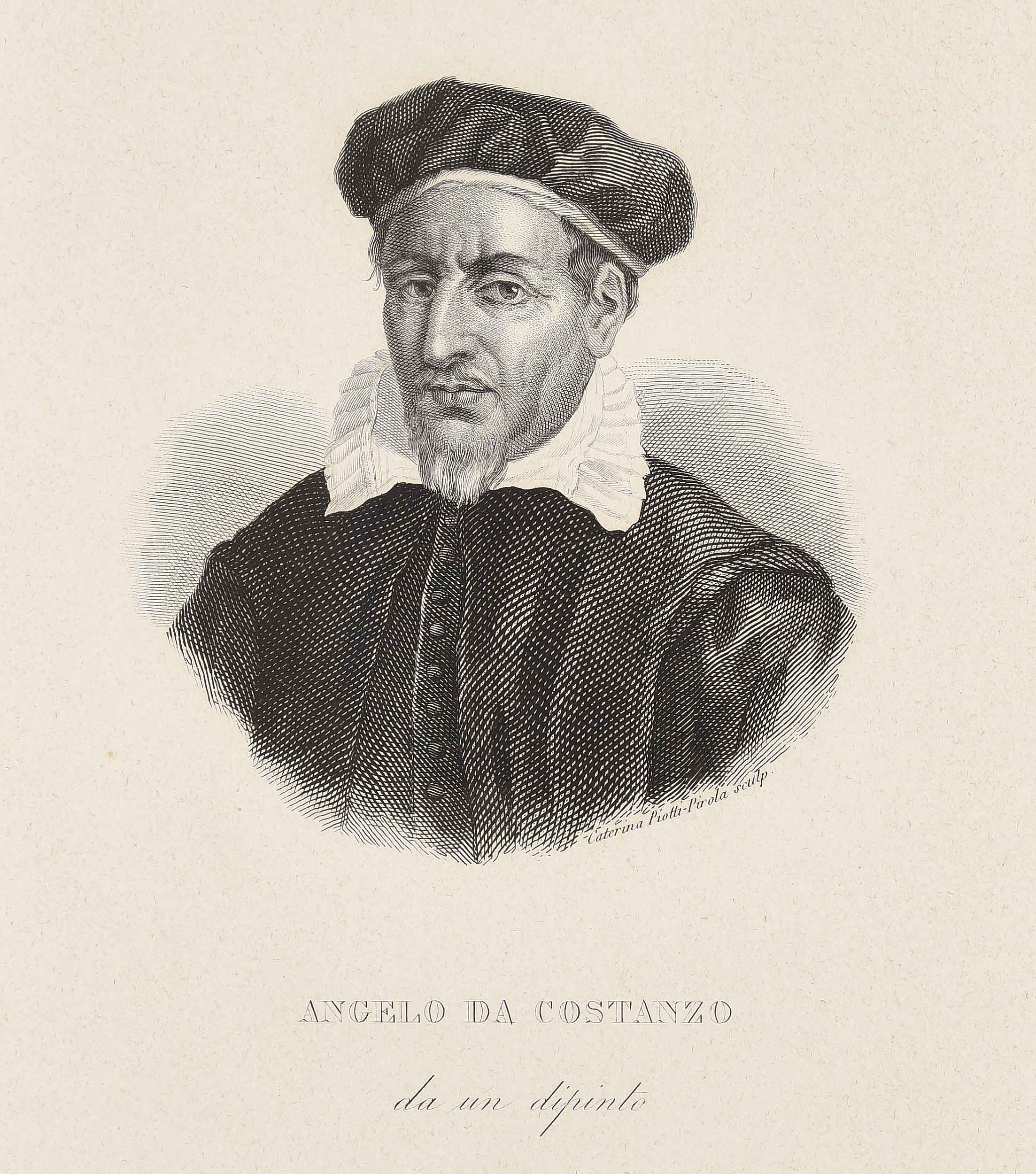
- Born: c. 1507; Naples, Kingdom of Naples
- Died: November 1591; Naples, Kingdom of Naples
- Occupations: Historian; Poet; Renaissance humanist
- Spouse: Lucrezia Di Costanzo
- Children: 2
- Parent(s): Alessandro di Costanzo and Roberta di Costanzo (née Sanfremondo)

Academic background
- Influences: Petrarch; Sannazaro

Academic work
- Discipline: Medieval studies
- Sub-discipline: History of italy
- Influenced: Giannone

Angelo di Costanzo (c. 1507 – November 1591), Italian historian and poet, was born at Naples around 1507. His great work, Le Istorie del regno di Napoli dal 1250 fino al 1498, first appeared at Naples in 1572, and was the fruit of thirty or forty years labour; but nine more years were devoted to the task before it was issued in its final form at Aquila (1581). It is one of the best known histories of Naples, and the style is distinguished by clearness, simplicity and elegance.

== Life ==
Angelo di Costanzo was born of a noble family in Naples in 1507. He lived in a literary circle, and fell in love with the beautiful Vittoria Colonna. In 1527 he quitted Naples in company with Jacopo Sannazaro and Francesco Poderigo. In conversation with his friends they joined in regretting the want of any trustworthy history of Naples, and lamented the inaccuracy of Pandolfo Collenuccio. The older men suggested to Costanzo that he should undertake the task and promised their assistance; but within three years both were dead, and Costanzo had to pursue his task unaided.

He began his history with the death of Frederick II and continued it till the beginning of the barons' war against Ferdinand I of Naples in 1486. Costanzo's work was the labour of his lifetime; he published a first instalment in 1572, but the final edition only appeared in 1581. Costanzo's narrative remains the best account of Neapolitan history for the period of which he treats. It is written with care and insight, and is the work of a scholar and of a patriot. A second edition of his history appeared at Venice, 1710, and a third at Naples, 1735, with a life of Constanzo by Bernardino Tafuri.

Di Costanzo was also a poet of some renown. his poems were included in many of the Italian anthologies. His flamboyant style was reminiscent of earlier, more extravagant fifteenth-century poets such as Panfilio Sasso and Antonio Tebaldeo.
