= Jacopo Saltarelli =

Italian model

Jacopo d’Andrea Saltarelli (born c. 1459) was an apprentice goldsmith and male prostitute, sometimes described in modern literature as an artist's model, about whom nothing is known except the details of court records of several charges of prostitution, in one of which Leonardo da Vinci was among the accused.

On April 9, 1476, an anonymous denunciation was left in the tamburo (letter box) in the Palazzo della Signoria (town hall) accusing him of being "party to many wretched affairs and consents to please those persons who request such wickedness of him". The denunciation accused four people of engaging in sodomy with Saltarelli: Baccino, a tailor; Leonardo da Vinci; Bartolomeo di Pasquino; and Leonardo Tornabuoni, a member of the aristocratic Tornabuoni family. Saltarelli's name was known to the authorities because another man had been convicted of sodomy with him earlier the same year. Charges against the five were dismissed on the condition that no further accusations appear in the tamburo. The same accusation did in fact appear on June 7 but charges were again dismissed. The charges were dismissed because the accusations did not meet the legal requirement for prosecution: all accusations of sodomy had to be signed, but this one was not. (Such accusations could be made secretly, but not anonymously.) There is speculation that since the family of one of the accused, Leonardo Tornabuoni, was associated with Lorenzo de' Medici, the family exerted its influence to secure the dismissal. A painting of Jacopo Saltarelli was then used to represent a white version of Jesus Christ.

== See also ==
- Leonardo da Vinci's personal life

== Bibliography ==
- Abbott, Elizabeth (2001). A History of Celibacy. Da Capo Press. ISBN 0-306-81041-7.
- Crompton, Louis (2006). Homosexuality and Civilization. Harvard University Press. ISBN 0-674-02233-5.
- Gilbert, Creighton and Michelangelo Merisi da Caravaggio (1995). Caravaggio and His Two Cardinals. Penn State Press. ISBN 0-271-01312-5.
- Wittkower, Rudolph and Margaret Wittkower (2006). Born Under Saturn: The Character and Conduct of Artists : A Documented History from Antiquity to the French Revolution. New York, New York Review of Books. ISBN 1-59017-213-2.
