= Scipione Capece =

Italian jurist and poet

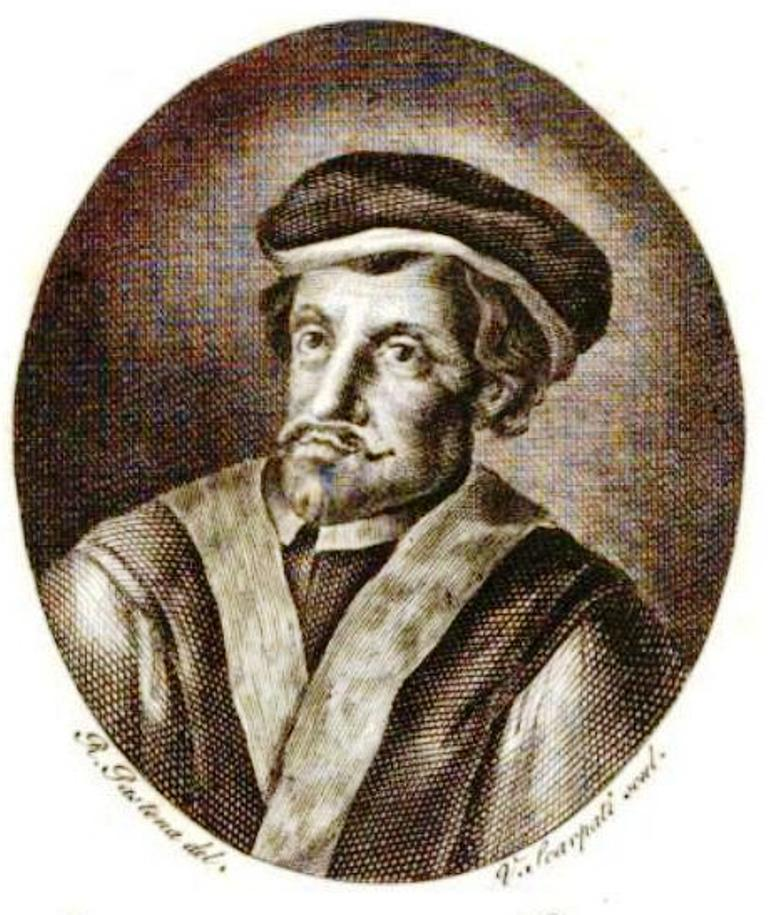
Scipione Capece

Scipione Capece (Latin: Scipio Capicius; Naples, c. 1480 – Naples, 9 December 1551) was an Italian jurist, humanist and poet, professor of Civil Law and president of the Accademia Pontaniana.

He wrote three poems: Inarime (1532), De vate maximo (1533) and De principiis rerum (1546).

== Works ==
- Da vate maximo (in Latin). 1533.
- De principiis rerum (in Latin). Padua: Giuseppe Comino. 1751 [1546].
