= Equestrian statue of Bartolomeo Colleoni (Warsaw) =

Monument in Warsaw, Poland

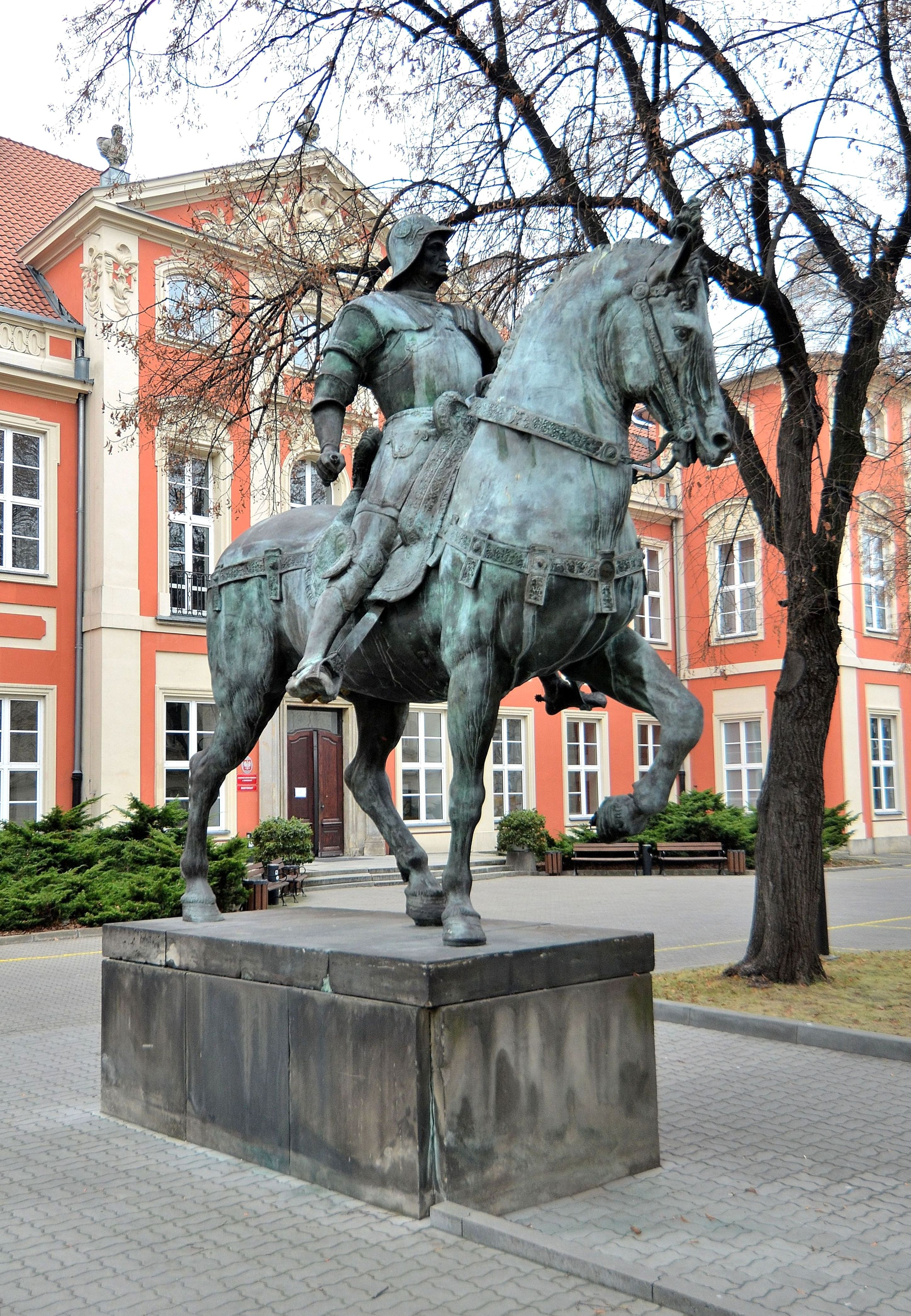
- The statue in 2014.
- Interactive map of Equestrian statue of Bartolomeo Colleoni
- Coordinates: 53°25′49.03″N 14°33′01.81″E
- Designer: Andrea del Verrocchio (author of the original sculpture)
- Type: Equestrian statue
- Material: Bronze
- Height: 4 m (13 ft)
- Completion date: 2002
- Opening date: 1950 (unveiling of the original in Warsaw); 2002 (unveiling of the replica)
- Dedicated to: Bartolomeo Colleoni

The equestrian statue of Bartolomeo Colleoni (Note: Italian pronunciation: [bartoloˈmɛːo kolleˈoːni]; Polish: Pomnik Bartolomea Colleoniego; German: Reiterstandbild Bartolomeo Colleoni; Italian: Monumento equestre a Bartolomeo Colleoni) is a bronze equestrian statue in Warsaw, Poland, placed at the courtyard of the Czapski Palace, belonging to the Academy of Fine Arts, located at 5 Kraków Suburb Street. It is dedicated to Bartolomeo Colleoni, a 15-century mercenary and a captain general in service of the Republic of Venice. The sculpture is a replica, which replaced the statue which stood at the same location from 1950 to 2002, until being moved to Szczecin. It in turn was a copy of a 1495 statue in Venice, Italy by Andrea del Verrocchio.

== History ==
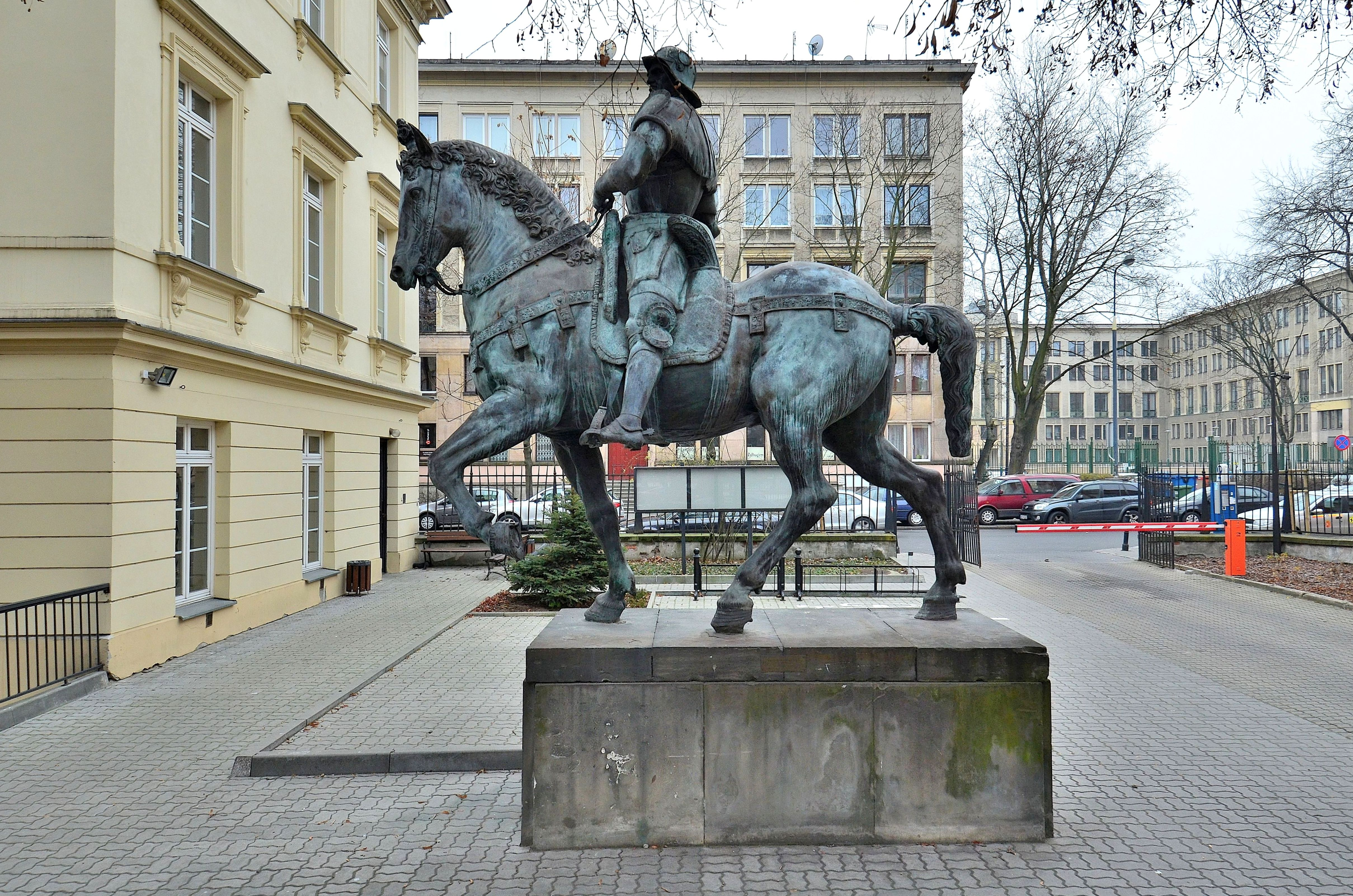
The statue from its left side.

The statue is currently located in Warsaw in a replica of a 1909 sculpture made in a electrotyping technique. It was a copy of a 1495 statue in Venice, Italy by Andrea del Verrocchio. The statue was financed by Helmut and Else Toepfer, and manufactured in Wüerttembergische Metallwarenfabrik (Wüerttemberg Metal Goods Factory) in Geislingen an der Steige, Germany. It became a central point of antiquity and renaissance art exhibition of the Szczecin Municipal Museum (now National Museum in Szczecin) opened in 1913. It became one of the most valuable pieces in the museum's collection.

The statue survived the Second World War undamaged. In 1947, the West Pomeranian Committee for the Capital Reconstruction, had given it, together with the rest of the museum's antiquity and renaissance collection, to the city of Warsaw. In exchange, it received the collection of Polish art.

The sculpture was transported in pieces by rail to Warsaw on 15 January 1948. Originally, it was given to the National Museum in Warsaw, and was put in its warehouse. In 1950, it was unveiled at the courtyard of the Czapski Palace, belonging to the Academy of Fine Arts. It was placed on a small pedestal, near Traugutta Street. It was used by students as a model, and over the years, it became traditionally associated with the university. On 5 June 1989, the statue was added to the heritage list.

The first attempts to recover the collection, which included the statue, were undertaken by members of the Solidarity trade union of the Szczecin National Museum in 1981. In 1992, the city government also joined in the efforts. In 2001, the mayor of Szczecin asked the mayor of Warsaw for help in recovering the statue. The rest of art collections exchanged between the cities, were already returned by this point.

In September 2001, both cities signed agreement about the return of the statue. The Academy of Fine Arts agreed for its return in exchange for Szczecin compensating the manufacturing of its copy, with 300,000 zloties.

On 21 August 2002, the original monument was placed at the Aviators Square in Szczecin. The unveiled ceremony was held on 31 August, and was attended by the city mayor, Edmund Runowicz, and Guardo Colleoni, descendant of Bartolomeo Colleoni. The same year, in its previous location in Warsaw was placed its replica, cast in bronze.

In 2004, the National Bank of Poland realised a collectioner 20-złoty-coin, which depicted the statue on its reverse. It commemorated the 100th anniversary of the Academy of Fine Arts.

== Design ==
The bronze statue depicts Bartolomeo Colleoni, wearing plate armour and helmet, while seating on a walking hoarse. The sculpture is placed on a small concrete pedestal, at the courtyard of the Czapski Palace, belonging to the Academy of Fine Arts
