= Equestrian statue of Bartolomeo Colleoni (Szczecin) =

1909 sculpture in Szczecin

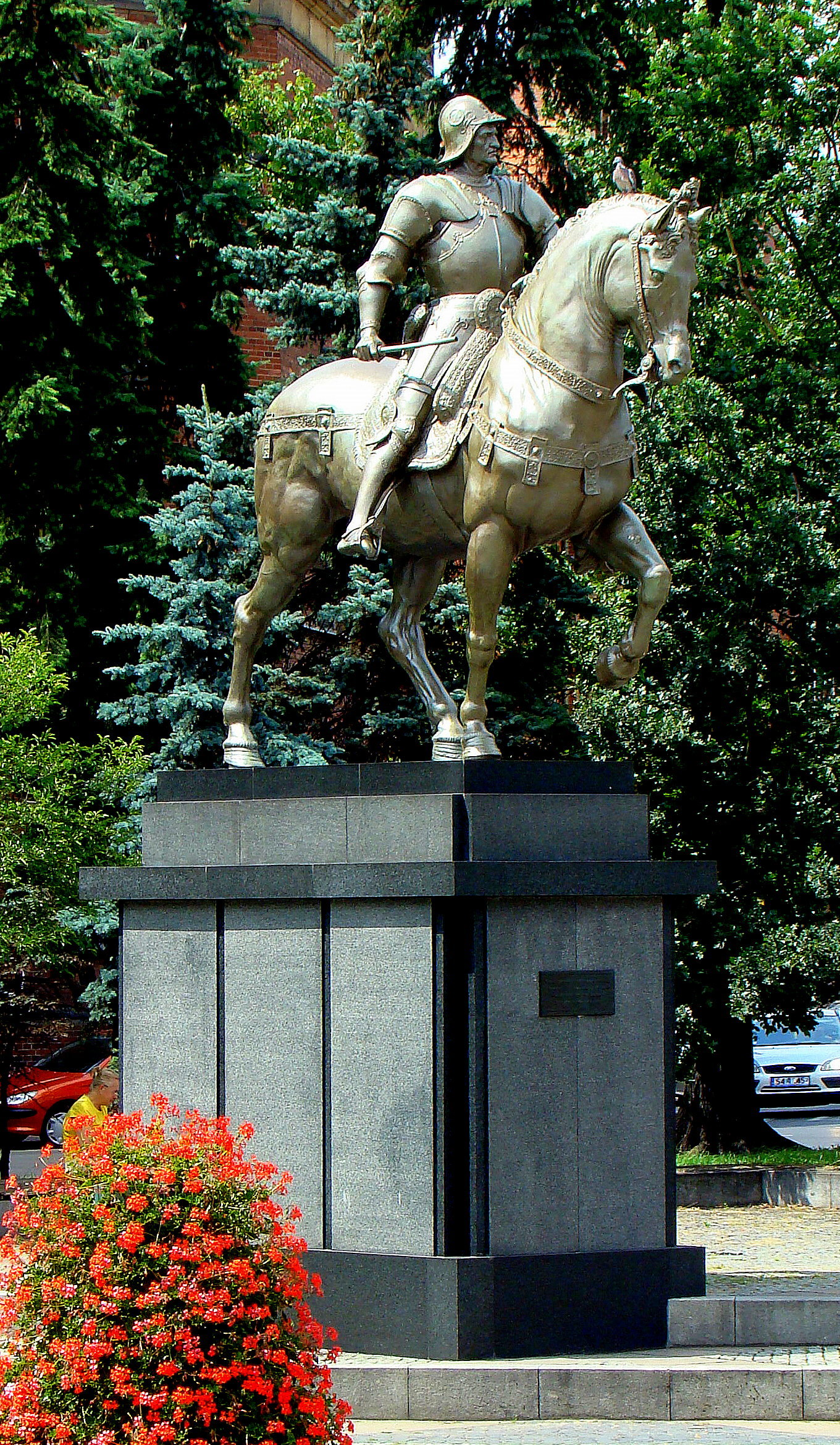
- The statue in 2009
- Interactive map of Equestrian statue of Bartolomeo Colleoni
- Location: Aviators Square, Szczecin, Poland
- Coordinates: 53°25′49.03″N 14°33′01.81″E
- Designer: Andrea del Verrocchio (author of the original sculpture)
- Type: Equestrian statue
- Material: Bronze
- Height: 4 m (13 ft)
- Completion date: 1909
- Opening date: 1913 (original unveiling); 1950 (second unveiling); 21 August 2002 (third unveiling)
- Dedicated to: Bartolomeo Colleoni

The equestrian statue of Bartolomeo Colleoni (Note: Italian pronunciation: [bartoloˈmɛːo kolleˈoːni]; Polish: Pomnik Bartolomea Colleoniego; German: Reiterstandbild Bartolomeo Colleoni; Italian: Monumento equestre a Bartolomeo Colleoni) is a bronze equestrian statue in Szczecin, Poland, placed at the Aviators Square, within the neighbourhood of Centrum. It is dedicate to Bartolomeo Colleoni, a 15-century mercenary and a captain general in service of the Republic of Venice. The sculpture was made in a electrotyping technique in 1909, as a copy of a 1495 statue in Venice, Italy by Andrea del Verrocchio. It was originally unveiled as part of the exhibition in the National Museum in Szczecin in 1913. In 1948, it was moved to Warsaw, Poland, and in 1950, placed at the courtyard of the Czapski Palace, belonging to the Academy of Fine Arts. On 21 August 2002, it was returned to Szczecin and placed at its current location. Its replica remains in Warsaw.

== History ==
The sculpture was made in a electrotyping technique in 1909, as a copy of a 1495 statue in Venice, Italy by Andrea del Verrocchio. It was financed by Helmut and Else Toepfer, and manufactured in Wüerttembergische Metallwarenfabrik (Wüerttemberg Metal Goods Factory) in Geislingen an der Steige, Germany. It became a central point of antiquity and renaissance art exhibition of the Szczecin Municipal Museum (now National Museum in Szczecin) opened in 1913. It became one of the most valuable pieces in the museum's collection.

The statue survived the Second World War undamaged. In 1947, the West Pomeranian Committee for the Capital Reconstruction, had given it, together with the rest of the museum's antiquity and renaissance collection, to the city of Warsaw. In exchange, it received the collection of Polish art.

The monument was transported in pieces by rail to Warsaw on 15 January 1948. Originally, it was given to the National Museum in Warsaw, and was put in its warehouse. In 1950, it was unveiled at the courtyard of the Czapski Palace, belonging to the Academy of Fine Arts. It was placed on a small pedestal, near Traugutta Street. It was used by students as a model, and over the years, it became traditionally associated with the university. On 5 June 1989, the statue was added to the heritage list.

The first attempts to recover the collection, which included the statue, were undertaken by members of the Solidarity trade union of the Szczecin National Museum in 1981. In 1992, the city government also joined in the efforts. In 2001, the mayor of Szczecin asked the mayor of Warsaw for help in recovering the statue. The rest of art collections exchanged between the cities, were already returned by this point.

In September 2001, both cities signed agreement about the return of the statue. The Academy of Fine Arts agreed for its return in exchange for Szczecin compensating the manufacturing of its copy, with 300,000 zloties.

On 21 August 2002, the original monument was placed at the Aviators Square in Szczecin. The unveiling ceremony was held on 31 August, and was attended by the city mayor, Edmund Runowicz, and Guardo Colleoni, descendant of Bartolomeo Colleoni. The same year, in its previous location in Warsaw was placed its replica, cast in bronze.

In 2009, the statue underwent a through renovation, which included adding previously brokeon off sword, held in Colleoni's right hand.

== Design ==
The bronze statue depicts Bartolomeo Colleoni, wearing plate armour and helmet, and holding a sword in his right hand. He seats on a walking hoarse. The sculpture is placed on a tall granite pedestal at the Aviators Square. It has total height of 4 m, length of 3.6 m, and width of 1.8 m. It features a plaque with the following inscription:

Kopia pomnika Bartolomea Colleoniego powróciła do Szczecina po 54 latach dzięki staranią mieszkańców przy wsparciu władż miasta

[The copy of the Bartolomeo Colleoni Monument was returned to Szczecin after 54 years, thanks to the efforts of the city residents, with support from the municipal government]

== Gallery ==
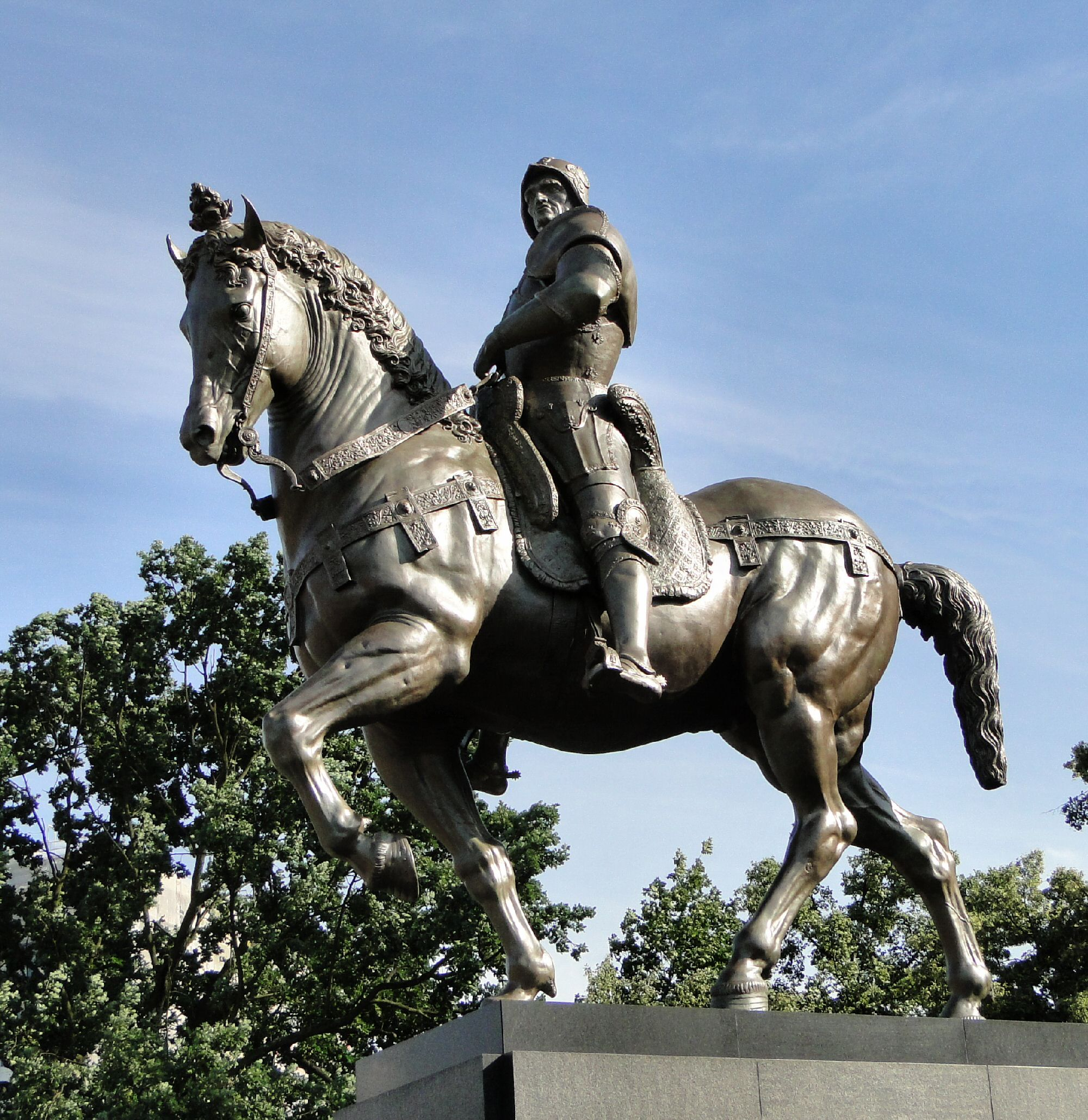
The right side of the statue

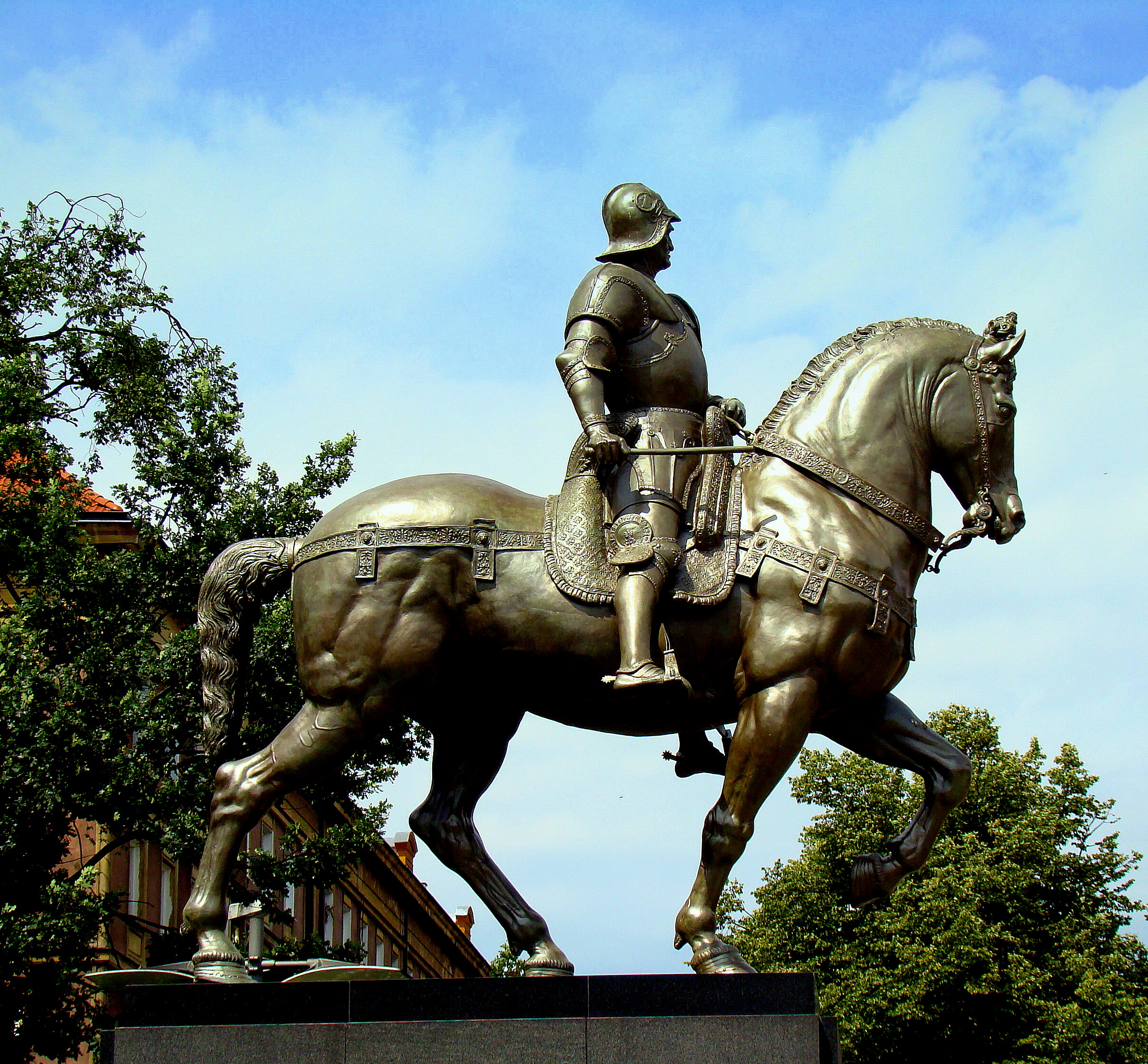
The left side of the statue

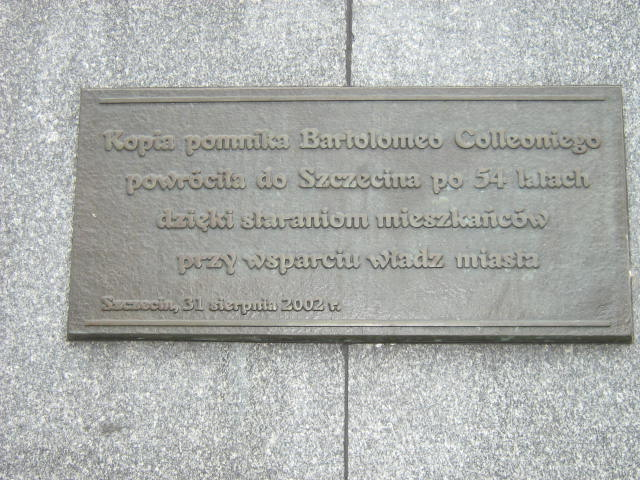
Commemorative plaque on the pedestal
