= Campo Santi Giovanni e Paolo =

Coordinates: 45°26′21″N 12°20′29″E

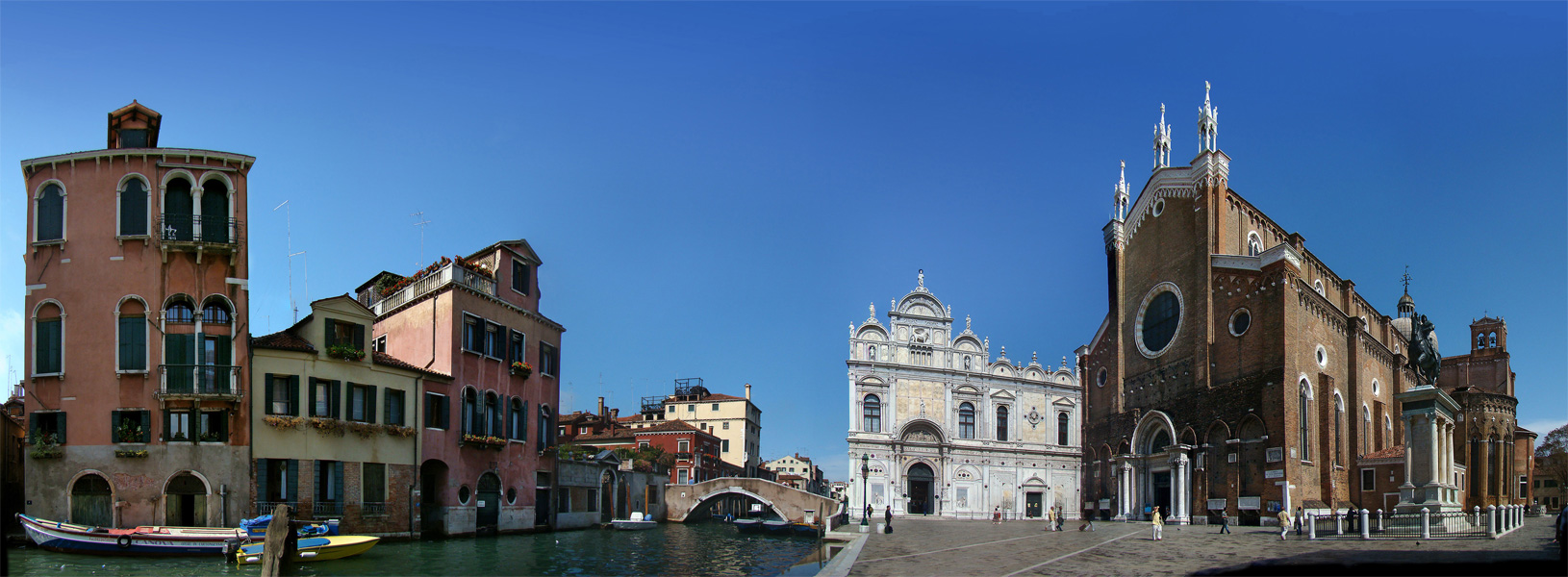
Campo Santi Giovanni e Paolo

Campo Santi Giovanni e Paolo is a city square in Venice, Italy.

== Buildings around the square ==
- Santi Giovanni e Paolo, Venice
- Statue of Bartolomeo Colleoni
