= Equestrian statue of Gattamelata =

Sculpture by Donatello in Padua, Italy

Coordinates: 45°24′05″N 11°52′47″E

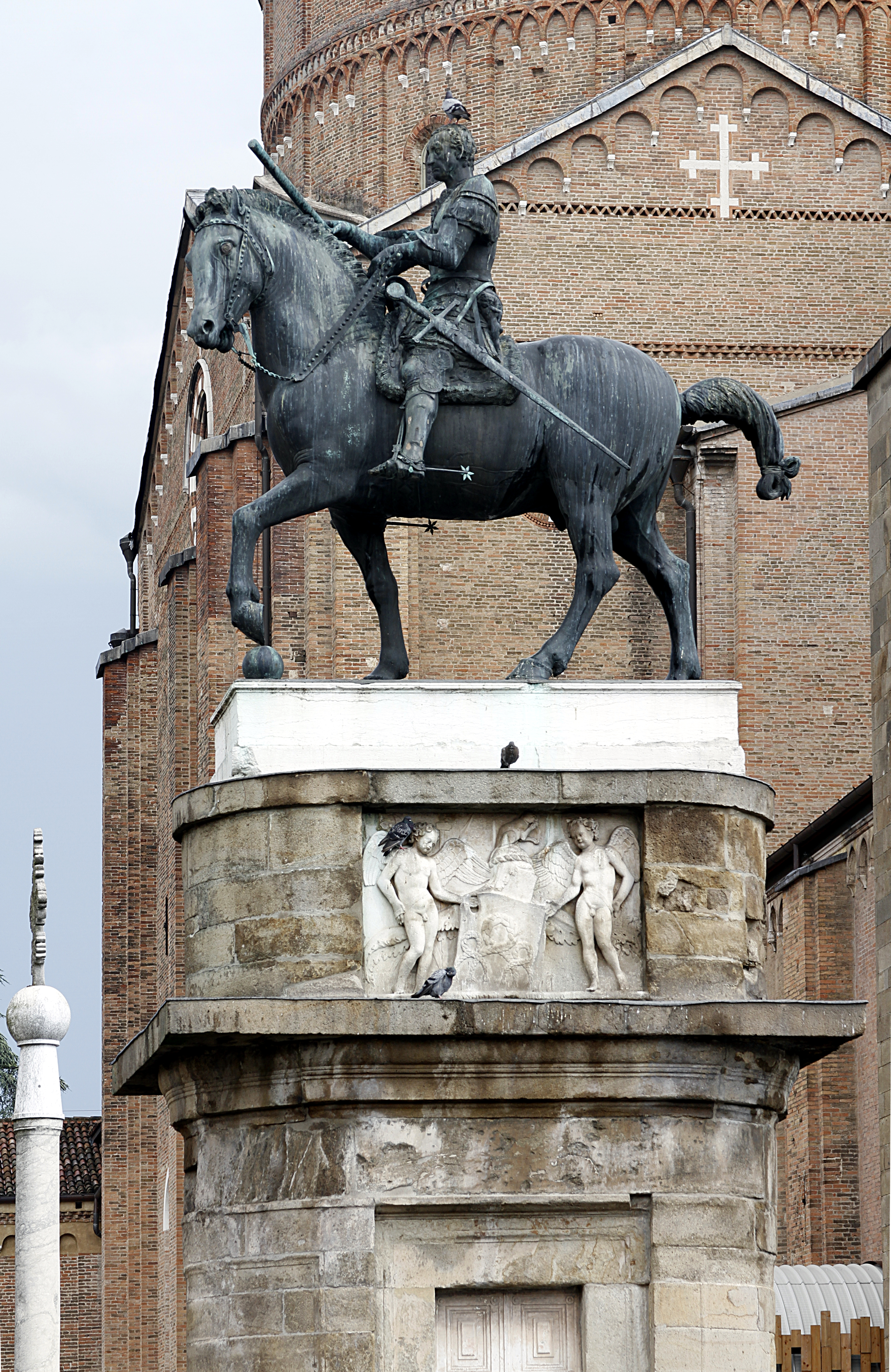
- Artist: Donatello
- Year: 1453
- Type: Bronze sculpture
- Location: Piazza del Santo, Padua, Italy

The Equestrian Statue of Gattamelata is an Italian Renaissance sculpture by Donatello, dating from 1453, located on the Piazza del Santo in Padua, Italy. It portrays the condottiere Erasmo da Narni, known as Gattamelata ("honey-cat"), who served mostly under the Republic of Venice, which ruled Padua at the time. It is the first full-size equestrian statue of the Italian Renaissance.

== Description ==
After Erasmo of Narni's death in 1443, according to John Julius Norwich, the Republic of Venice, as a sign of gratitude and respect, paid for a sculpture in his honor. (This payment has been disputed. See below.) Measuring 340 x 390 cm (the base measuring 780 x 410 cm), it is the earliest surviving Renaissance equestrian statue and the first to reintroduce the grandeur of Classical equestrian portraiture. After its conception, the statue served as a precedent for later sculptures honoring military heroes for their continued effort in the wars.

The statue, as were all bronze sculptures of this time, was made using the lost wax method. The statue sits on a pedestal, and both the condottiero and his horse are portrayed in life size. Instead of portraying the soldier as larger-than-life, as in the classical Equestrian Statue of Marcus Aurelius in Rome, where a sort of hierarchy of size demonstrates the subject's power, Donatello used emotion, position, and symbolism to convey the same message. Thus, Donatello makes a statement of the power of the real-life individual; he does not need to embellish or make grander whom Gattamelata was – the simple depiction of the real man is enough to convey his power.

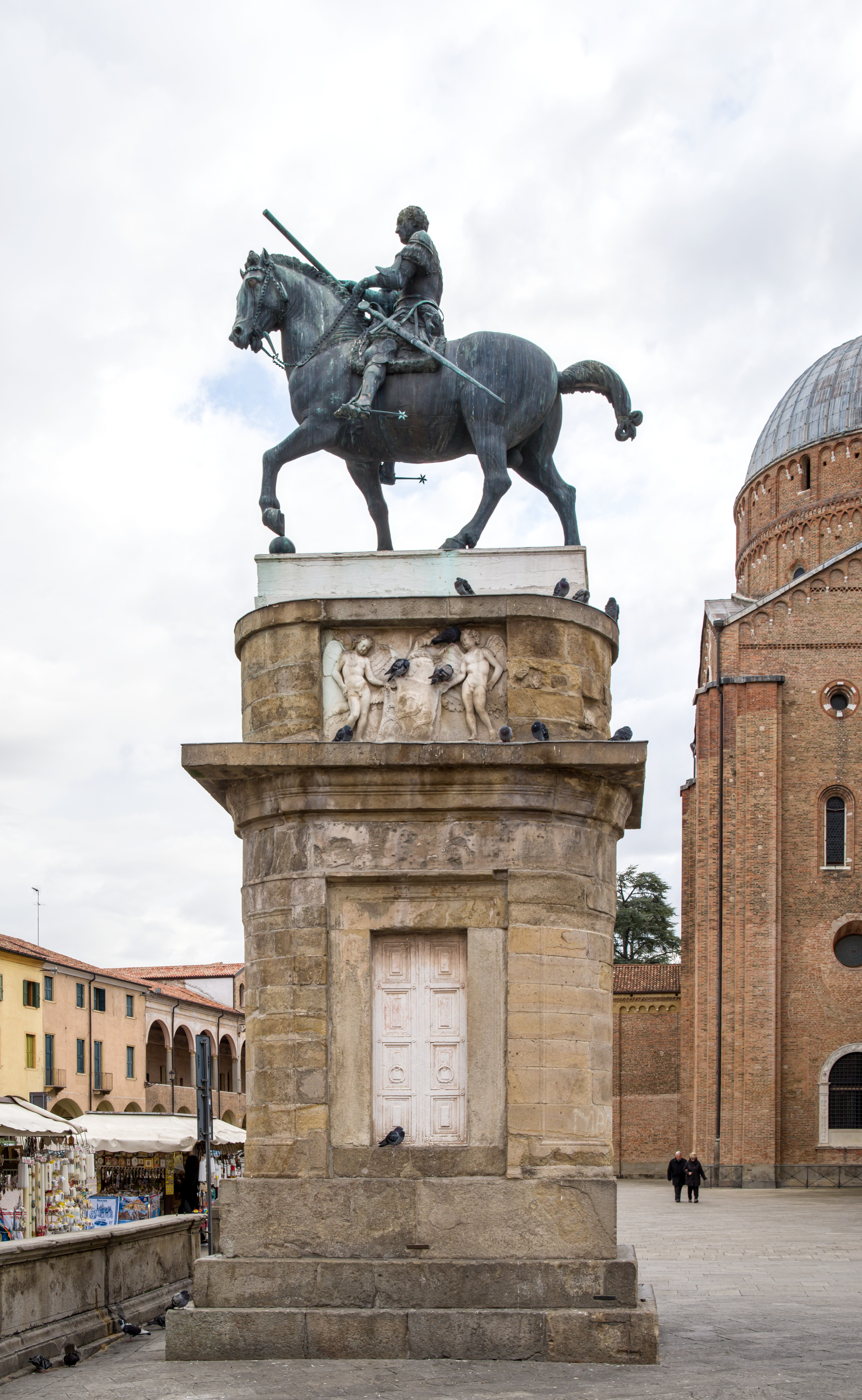
The statue with its pedestal

The pedestal under the horse is composed of two reliefs toward the top with fake doors underneath. The doors symbolize the gates of the underworld, lending the feeling of a tomb, though the monument was never a burial place. One relief shows Gattamelata's coat of arms presented by two winged putti. In the other relief two putti display battle armor.

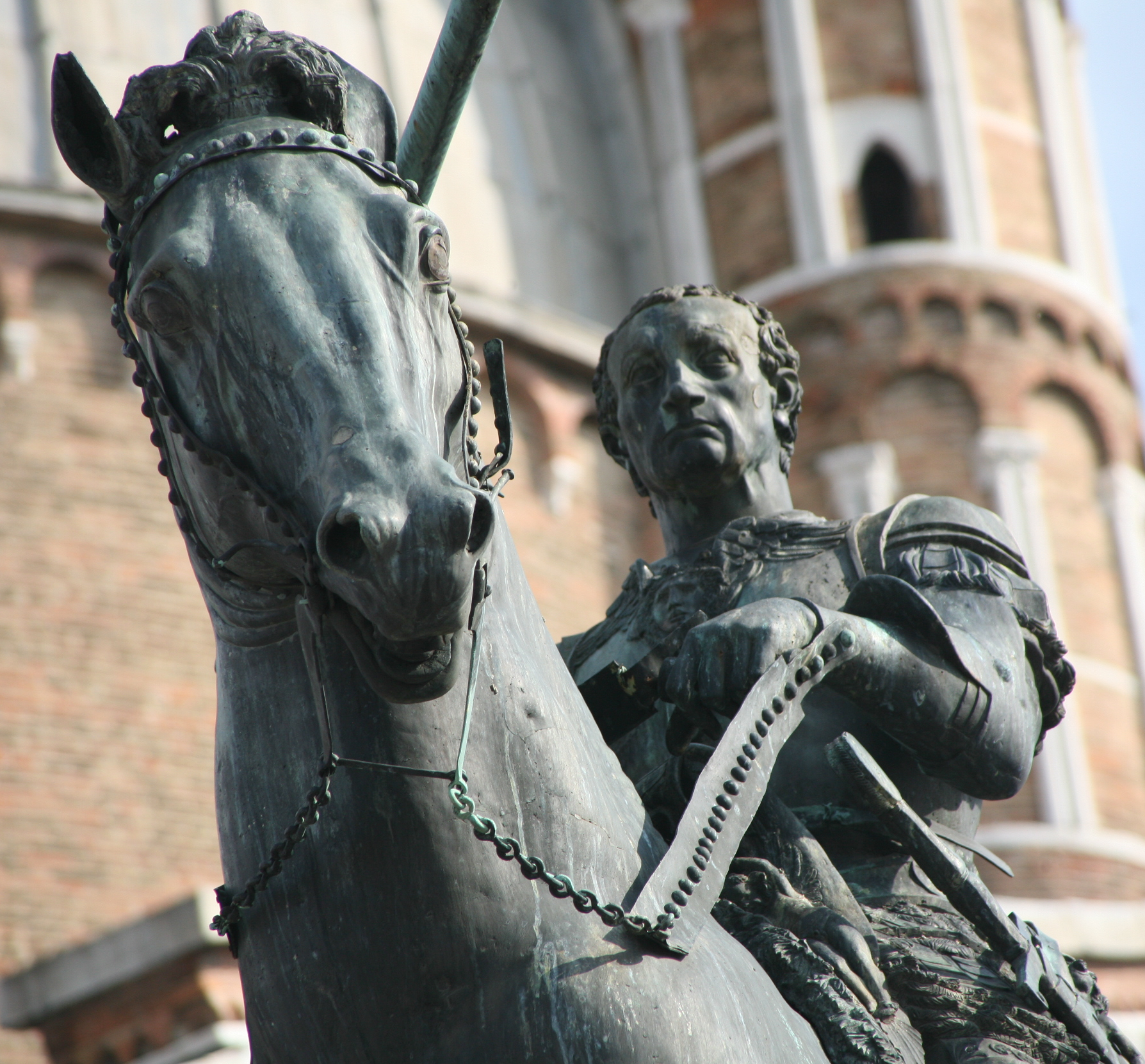
Detail

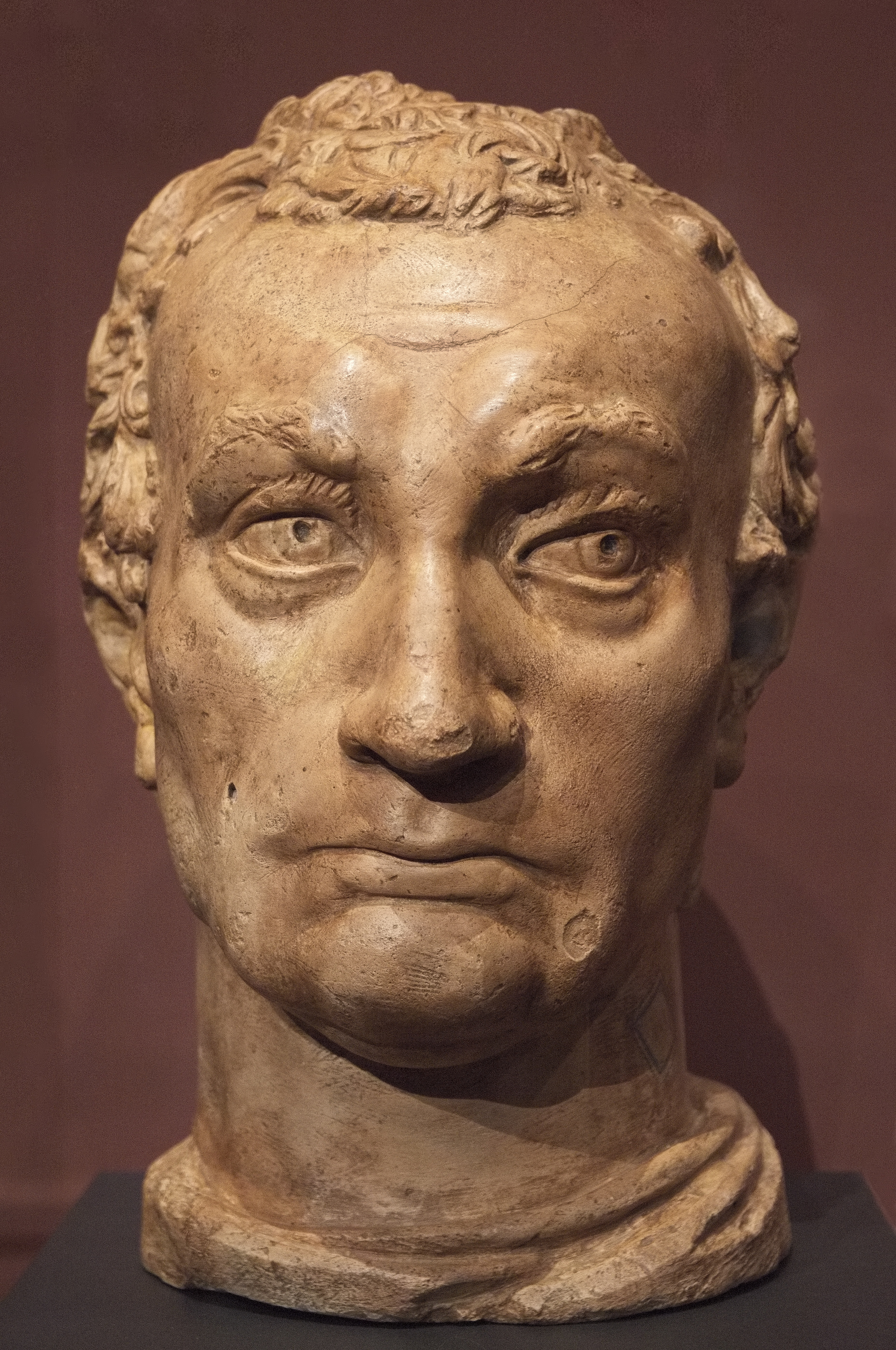
Plaster cast of the head of Donatello's Gattamelata, University of Padua

== Style ==
Erasmo da Narni (Gattamelata) sits high on his horse, looking out to the distance. The emotion on his face is serious. Donatello portrays Gattamelata as a composed, alert and watchful leader. The depiction of force of character and the reference to the power of real people flows with the Renaissance themes of individualism and humanism.

The horse echoes the alert, self-contained and courageous air of the rider. The realistic depiction of its muscular form reveals the Renaissance concern with anatomical study that was later developed in Leonardo da Vinci's studies for the Sforza equestrian monument.

Donatello also conveys Gattamelata's power with symbolism. He commands a powerful horse and both appear ready for battle. The horse's front left hoof rests on an orb, a cannonball, which symbolizes military advances, representing his power of the Venician army. Gattamelata was hired by Venice and made many advances to solidify the "terra" or earth around Venice for the Venician Government. This statue was raised by his family to honor the General. This is especially weird and noticeable as Gattamelata was not a head of state. Gattamelata is portrayed as a warrior figure, carrying a baton symbolising his military leadership and with a lengthy sword. While Gattamelata died in his 70s, Donatello depicts him at the height of his power, further emphasizing his might and abilities.

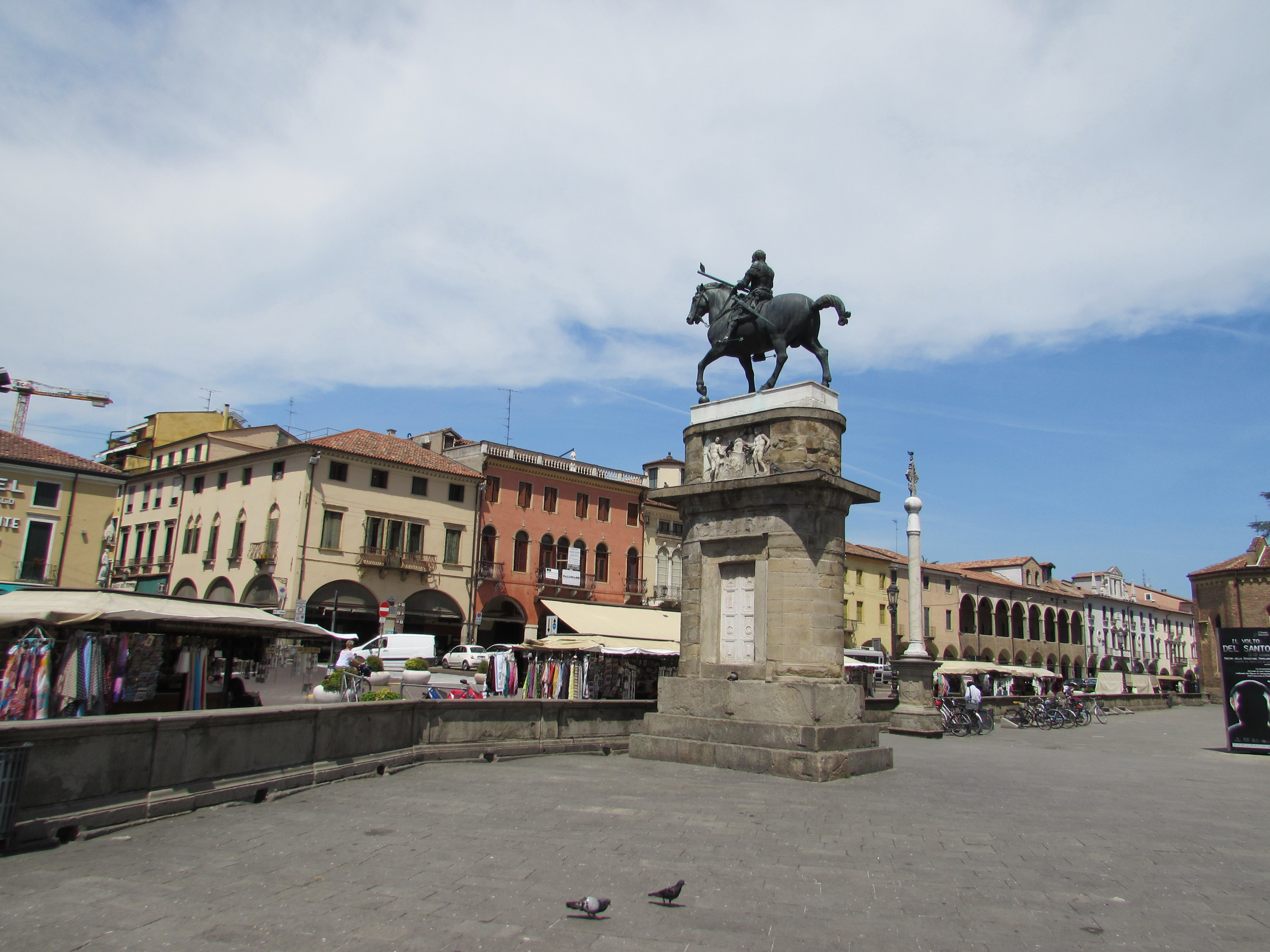
The statue is directed away from the Piazza and the Cathedral complex

The Equestrian statue of Gattamelata is a sharp departure from earlier, post-Classical equestrian statues, such as the Gothic Bamberg Horseman (c. 1230s). While the Bamberg Horseman depicts a German emperor, it lacks the dimension, power, and naturalism of Gattamelata. While that rider is also in fairly realistic proportion to his horse, he lacks the strength of Gattamelata. The latter is portrayed as a real man, his armor a badge of status; this ruler, however, appears almost deflated, lost in the carefully sculpted drapery that covers him. His power is derived solely from his crown, reflecting the differences that Renaissance individualism produced: here, position – the crown – is what matters, whereas in Gattamelata, it is the individual and his character that matter.

A comparison between the sculpture and that of Marcus Aurelius' equestrian statue shows how closely Donatello looked to classical art and its themes. In this depiction of Marcus Aurelius, the emperor dwarfs his horse, dominating it by size. However, the emperor also has a facial expression of dominance and determination. Marcus' horse is dressed up, and, while the emperor himself is clad in robes, not armor, he appears both the political and military leader. The attention to the horse's musculature and movement and the realistic depiction of the emperor (forgiving his size) are mirrored in Gattamelata. Also similar is the feeling of grandeur, authority, and power both portraits exude.

Another element that Donatello took from ancient sculpture is the trick of adding a support (a sphere) under the raised front leg of the horse, which appears also in the lost Regisole of Pavia, a bronze equestrian statue from either the late Western Roman Empire, the Ostrogothic Kingdom or the Byzantine Exarchate of Ravenna. In this sculpture a standing cat was used to carry the load under the horseshoe.

== History ==
In October 2025, the statue was removed from its pedestal to undergo an extensive restoration expected to last approximately 18 months.

== See also ==
- History of sculpture
- Equestrian statue of Bartolomeo Colleoni
