= Marek Koćmiel =

Mayor of Szczecin
- In office 24 January 2000 – 25 May 2001
- Preceded by: Marian Jurczyk
- Succeeded by: Edmund Runowicz

Member of the West Pomeranian Voivodeship Sejmik
- In office 1998–2000

Member of the City Council of Szczecin
- In office 1990–1994

Deputy mayor of Szczecin
- In office 1990–1991

Personal details
- Born: 1954 (age 71–72) Opoczno, Poland
- Party: Liberal Democratic Congress (until 1994); Freedom Union (1994–2001)
- Education: Szczecin University of Technology
- Occupation: Politician; Engineer; Businessperson

Marek Koćmiel (Polish: [ˈma.rɛk ˈkɔt͡ɕ.mjɛl]; born 1958) is a Polish engineer, businessperson, and politician. He was a member of the West Pomeranian Voivodeship Sejmik from 1998 to 2000, and the mayor of Szczecin, Poland from 2000 to 2001.

== Biography ==
Marek Koćmiel was born in 1958 in Opoczno, Poland. He had graduated from the Faculty of the Maritime Transportation of the Szczecin University of Technology. During his studies, in 1980, he waa co-founder of his university division of the Independent Students' Association, and a member of the redaction of oppositionist newsletter Muchomor.

From 1990 to 1994 he was a member of the city council of Szczecin, Poland, and from 1990 to 1991 he was a deputy mayor of the economics matters. Koćmiel was a member of the Liberal Democratic Congress, and later, the Freedom Union, of which, he was a chairperson of its division in the West Pomeranian Voivodeship. He left the party in 2001. From 1998 to 2000 he was a member of the West Pomeranian Voivodeship Sejmik. On 24 January 2000 he was appointed by the city council as the mayor of Szczecin, and served until 25 May 2001. He had retired from politics and operates a private business.
