= Aviators Square (Szczecin) =

Urban square in Szczecin, Poland

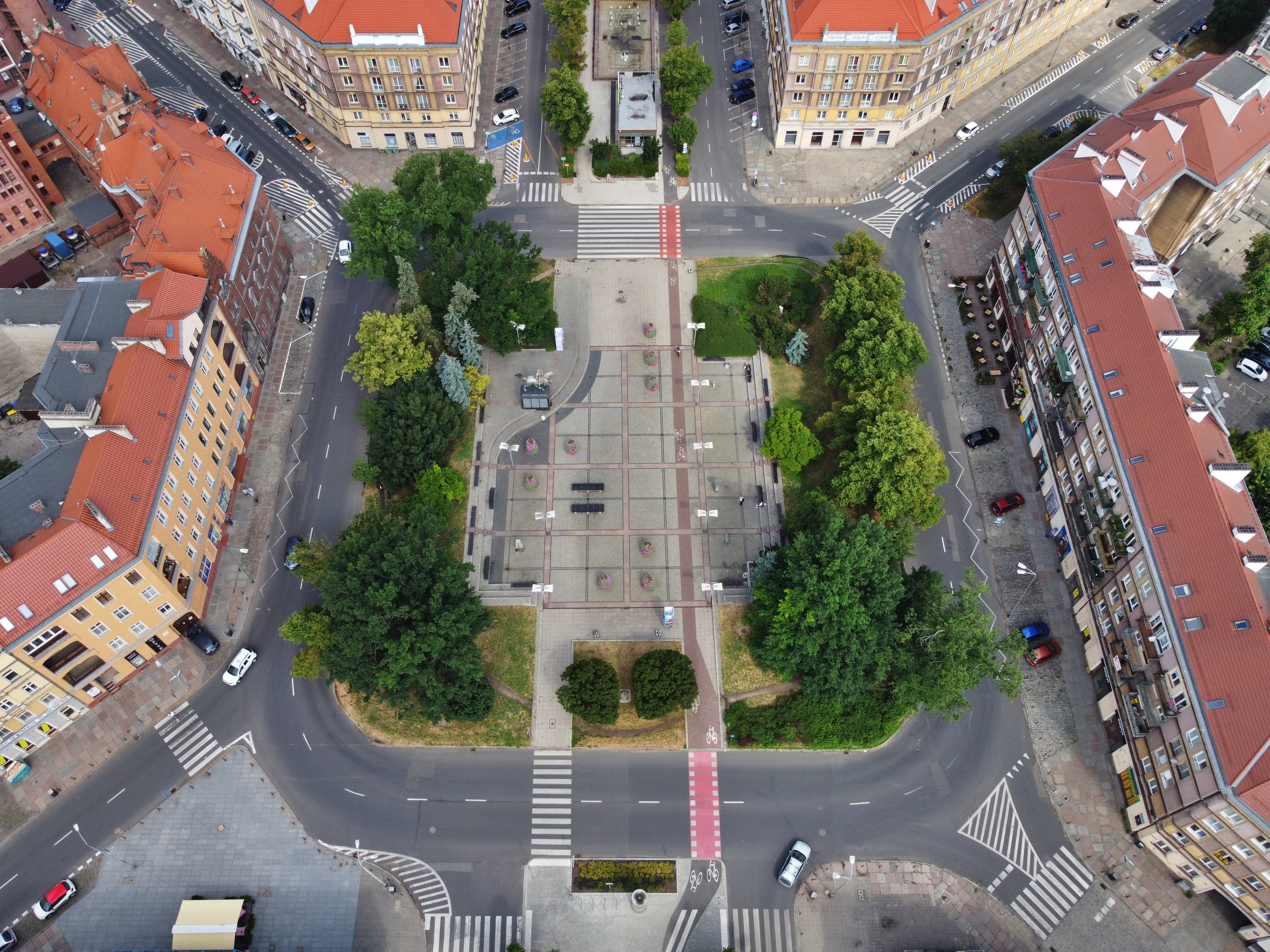
- The Aviators Square in 2021.

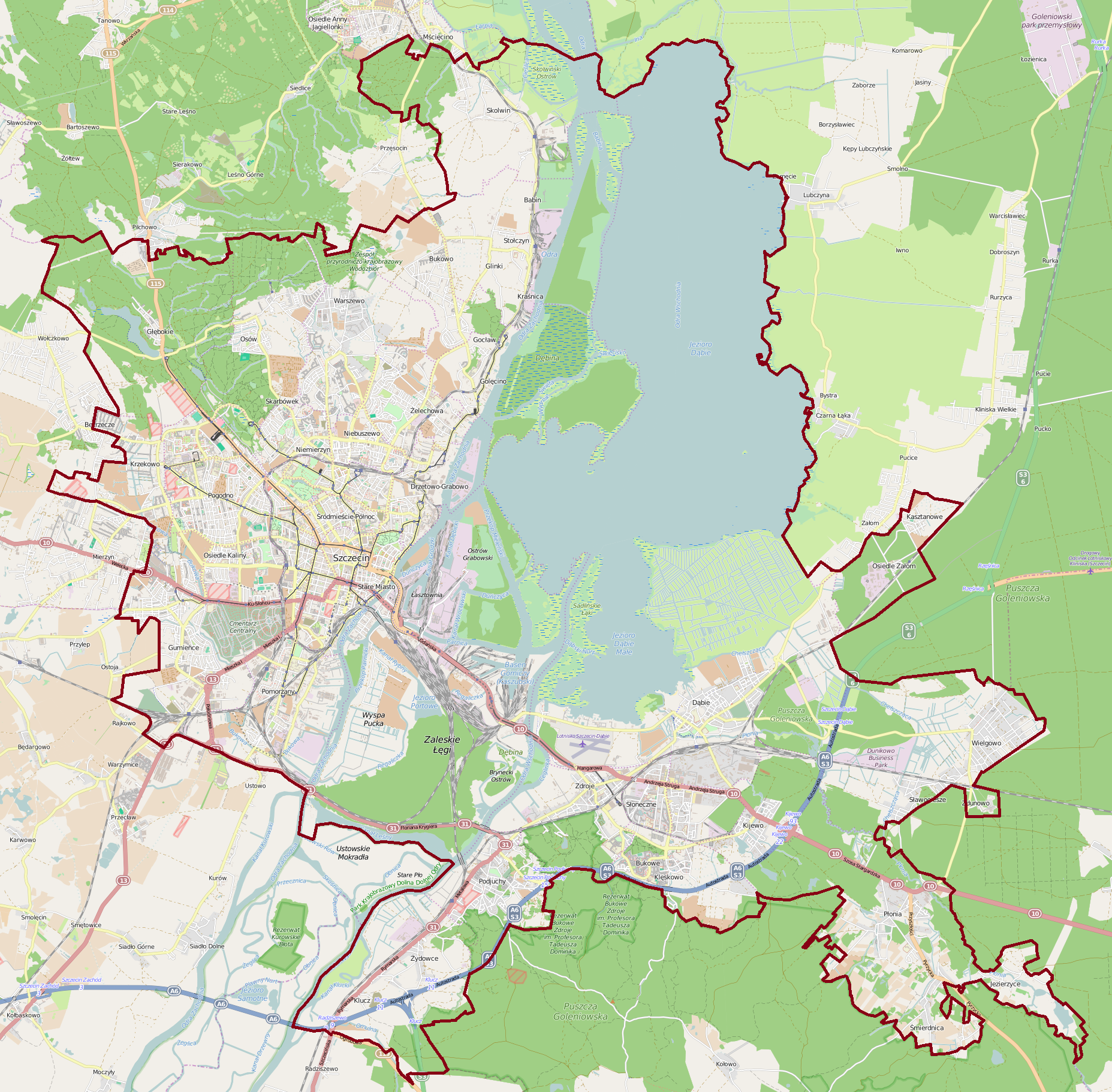
- Location within Szczecin Location within Poland
- Former name: Augusta Square (until 1945)
- Type: Urban square
- Location: Downtown, Szczecin, Poland
- Coordinates: 53°25′49.0″N 14°33′03.0″E
- North: Mazurska Street
- East: Małopolska Street; Pope John Paul II Avenue
- South: Kaszubska Street
- West: Pope John Paul II Avenue; Jagiellońska Street

Construction
- Completed: 1890s

The Aviators Square (Polish: Plac Lotników; German: Fliegerplatz), until 1945 known as the Augusta Square (German: Augustaplatz; Polish: Plac Augusty), is an urban square in Szczecin, Poland, located in the neighbourhood of Centre within the Downtown district. Placed on the axis of Pope John Paul II Avenue, it forms a square-shaped roundabout, intersecting with Jagiellońska, Kaszubska, Małopolska, and Mazurska Streets. It was opened in the 1890s, originally taking form of a garden square, being transformed into an urban square in 2002. It is surrounded by tenements and apartment buidlings. It features the equestrian statue of Bartolomeo Colleoni, a copy of the 1488 statue by Andrea del Verrocchio, unveiled at the square in 2002.

== History ==
The Aviators Square in 1909.

The Augusta Square was developed in the 1890s, as a recreational garden square, with paver paths, and surrounded by tenements. It formed a square-shaped roundabout on the axis of the current Pope John Paul II Avenue, intersecting with the current Jagiellońska, Kaszubska, Małopolska, and Mazurska Streets. It was named after Augusta of Saxe-Weimar-Eisenach, the Queen of Prussia and the first German Empress. One of the streets, now known as Pope John Paul II Avenue, was named Emperor Wilhelm Street (German: Kaiser-Wilhelm-Straße), was named after her husband, Wilhelm I, the emperor of Germany.

In 1945, it was renamed to the Aviators Square, in the commemoration of the officers of the Polish Air Force. Around half of the buildings surrounding the square, located in its northern and eastern sides, were destroyed during the Second World War. The apartment buildings were constructed in their place between 1955 and 1958, as part of the housing estate of the Downtown Residential District. They were designed to imitate the styles of the surrounding historic buildings blended with the principles of the contemporary socialist realist architecture.

In 1963, the abstract artificial stone sculpture by Stanisław Rudzik, titled The Composition, was placed at the square. In 1972, the artificial stone statue by Anna Paszkiewicz-Sawicka, titled The Motherhood, and depicting a mother holding an infant, was placed on the Pope John Paul II Avenue, near the Aviators Square. It was later moved to the Stefan Żeromski Park. In 1982, two abstract sculptures were unveiled at the square, as part of the series of twelve artworks placed alongside Pope John Paul II Avenue. They were the plastic sculpture by Michał Gałkiewicz, titled The Bird, which depicted a pigeon, and the marble sculpture by Anna Paszkiewicz-Sawicka, titled The Mairine Birds.

In 2002, it was renovated and remodeled, being transformed from a garden to an urban square. On 21 August 2002, the equestrian statue dedicated to Bartolomeo Colleoni, a 15-century mercenary and a captain general in service of the Republic of Venice, was placed at the square. The unveiling ceremony was held on 31 August 2002. The monument was originally made in 1909, as a copy of the 1488 statue in Venice, Italy, originally designed by Andrea del Verrocchio, and relocated from Szczecin to Warsaw in 1948, before being returned in 2002.

== Characteristics ==
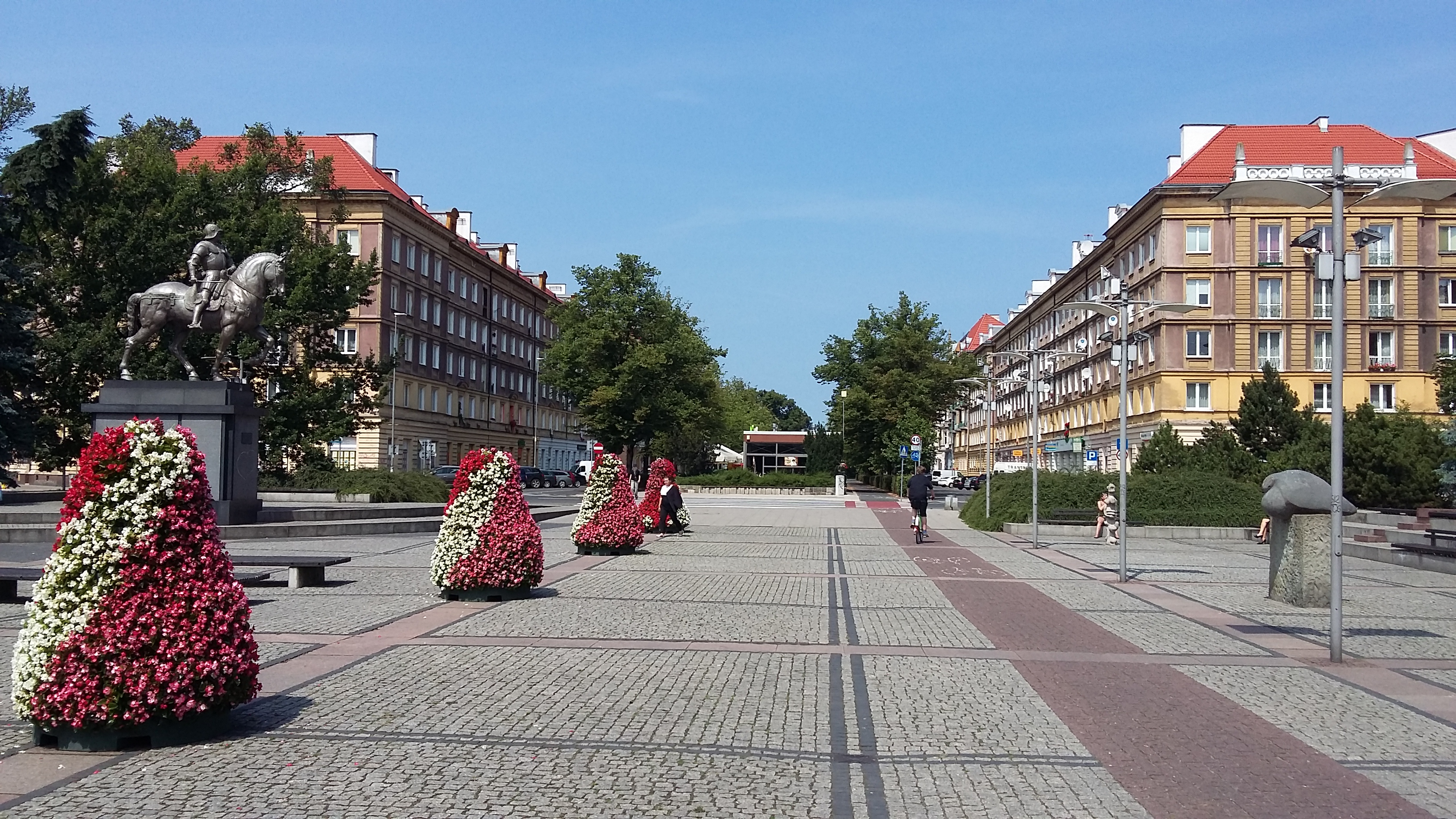
The main pathway of the Aviators Square

Aviators Square is a small urban square on the axis of Pope John Paul II Avenue. It forms a square-shaped roundabout, intersecting with Jagiellońska, Kaszubska, Małopolska, and Mazurska Streets. The square is surrounded by the historic tenements dating to the late 19th century and the early 20th century, and apartment buildings from the 1950s.

Aviators Square features the equestrian statue of Bartolomeo Colleoni, a 1909 copy of the 1488 statue by Andrea del Verrocchio, unveiled at the square in 2002. It also includes three other abstract sculptures. They are: the 1982 plastic sculpture by Michał Gałkiewicz, titled The Bird, which depicted a pigeon, the 1962 artificial stone sculpture by Stanisław Rudzik, titled The Composition, and the 1982 marble sculpture by Anna Paszkiewicz-Sawicka, titled The Mairine Birds.

== Gallery ==
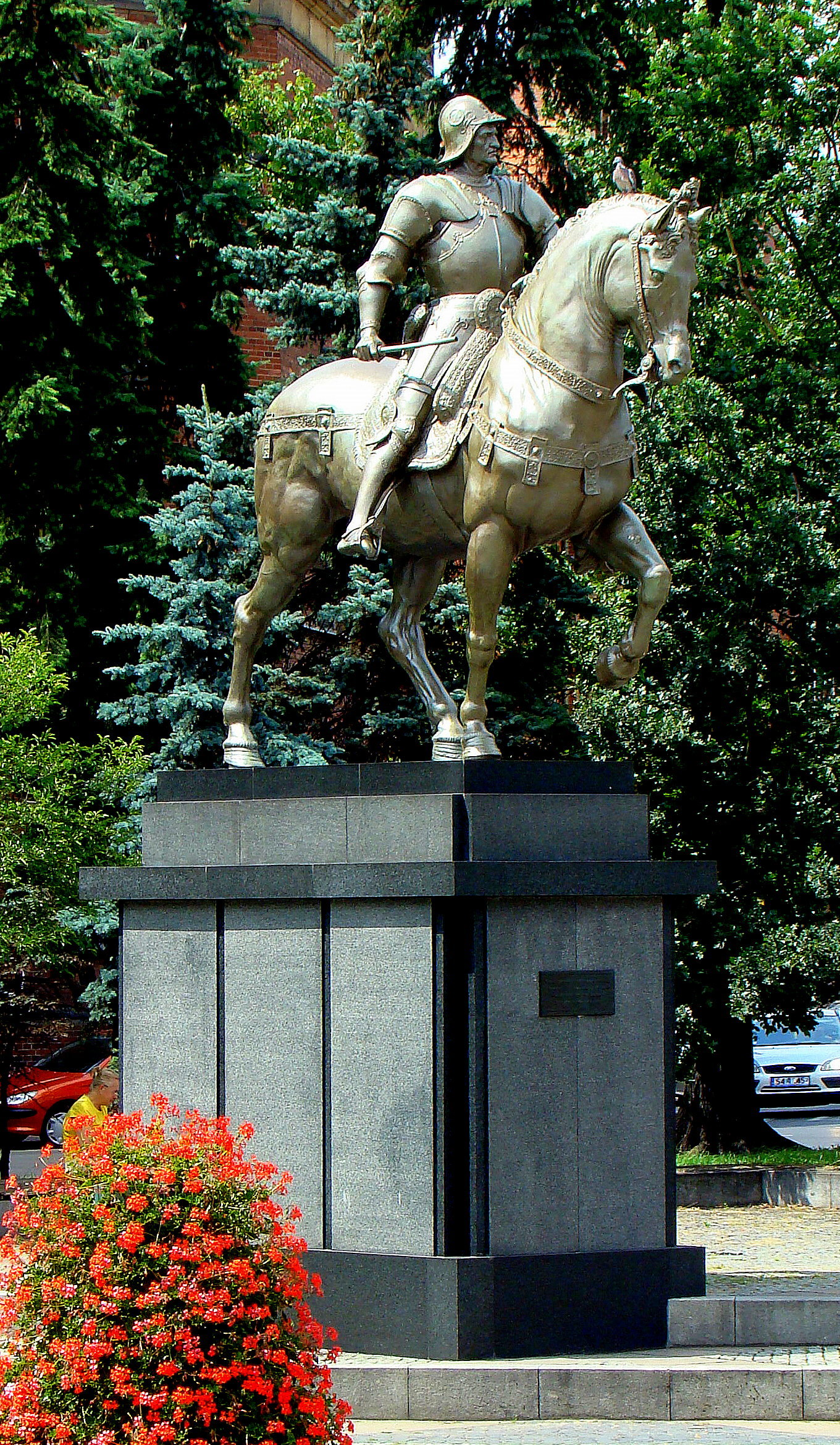
The equestrian statue of Bartolomeo Colleoni.

The 1982 sculpture The Bird by Michał Gałkiewicz.

The 1963 sculpture The Composition by Stanisław Rudzik.

The 1982 sculpture The Marine Birds by Anna Paszkiewicz-Sawicka.

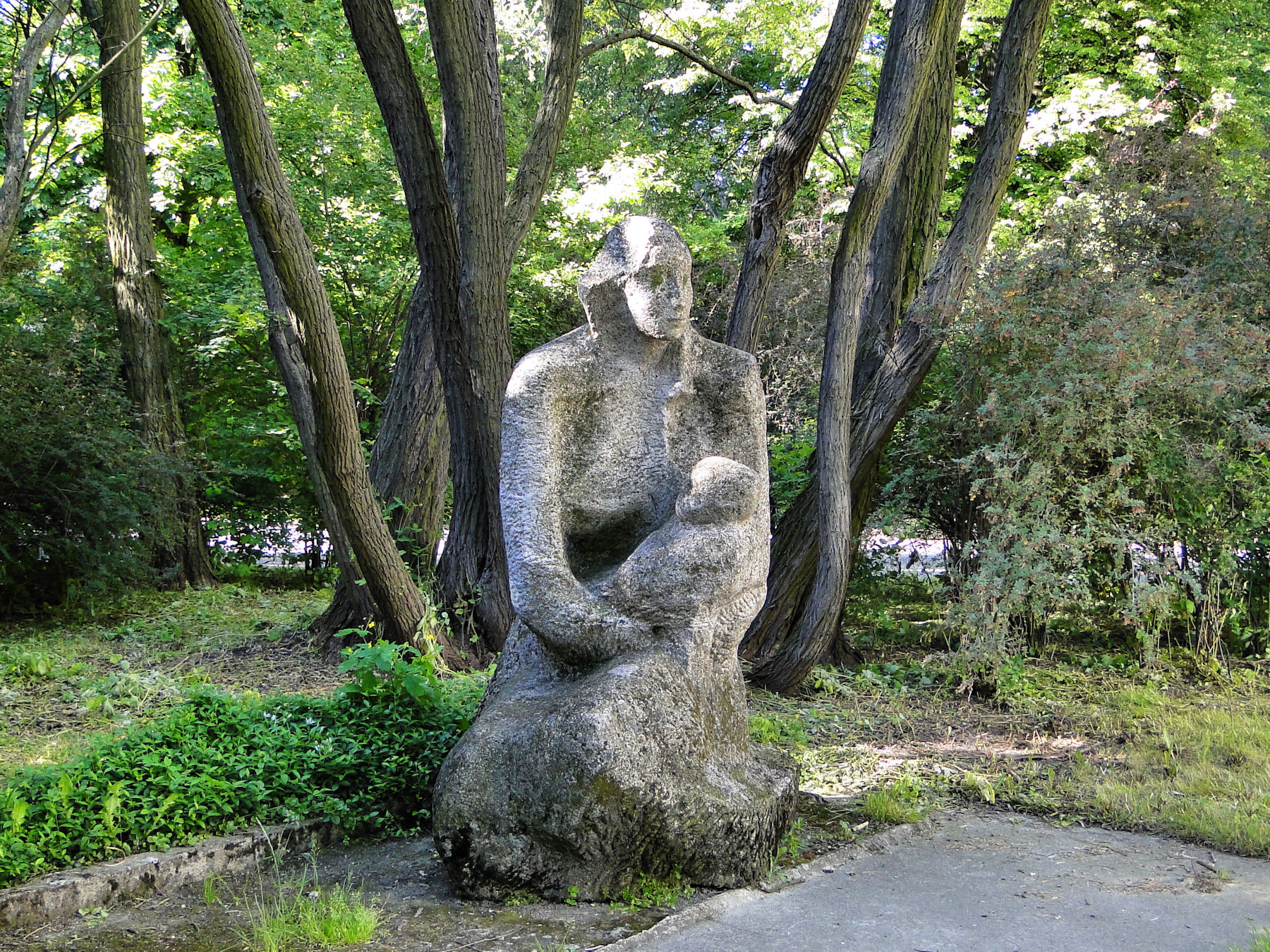
The 1972 sculpture The Motherhood by Anna Paszkiewicz-Sawicka, which previously stood on Pope John Paul II Avenue near the Aviators Square.
