= Marian Jurczyk =

Polish politician and Solidarity trade union activist

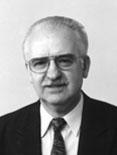

Mayor of Szczecin
- In office 18 November 1998 – 24 January 2000; 21 November 2002 – 4 December 2006
- Preceded by: Bartłomiej Sochański (1998); Edmund Runowicz (2002)
- Succeeded by: Marek Koćmiel (2000); Piotr Krzystek (2006)

Personal details
- Born: 16 October 1935 Karczewice, Second Polish Republic
- Died: 30 December 2014 (aged 79) Szczecin, Poland

Marian Jurczyk (16 October 1935 – 30 December 2014) was a Polish politician and Solidarity trade union activist.

He was a Senator in the Polish Senate from 1997 to 2000, and mayor of Szczecin from 18 November 1998 to 24 January 2000. On 21 November 2002 he was again elected mayor and served until 4 December 2006.

His achievements are however widely criticized and he is blamed for the compensation of over 10 million zloty, which the city must pay for canceling the land selling deal, his lack of formal education, and his apparent cluelessness in many important matters. Jurczyk's famous errors include forgetting the name of the deputy he had just nominated or quoting Jesus in a speech to the council.

Because of this criticism recall voices of recall were raised. On 23 March 2004 the necessary 32,000 signatures were received by the Recall Committee. A Recall referendum took place on 23 May 2004. However the necessary 30% turnout wasn't reached as only 19% of voters cast their ballots, though an overwhelming majority of those voting (92%) supported the mayor's recall.
