= Chopin family parlor =

Chopin Parlor, Warsaw museum site

Coordinates: 52.2395°N 21.0150°E

Chopin Family Parlor
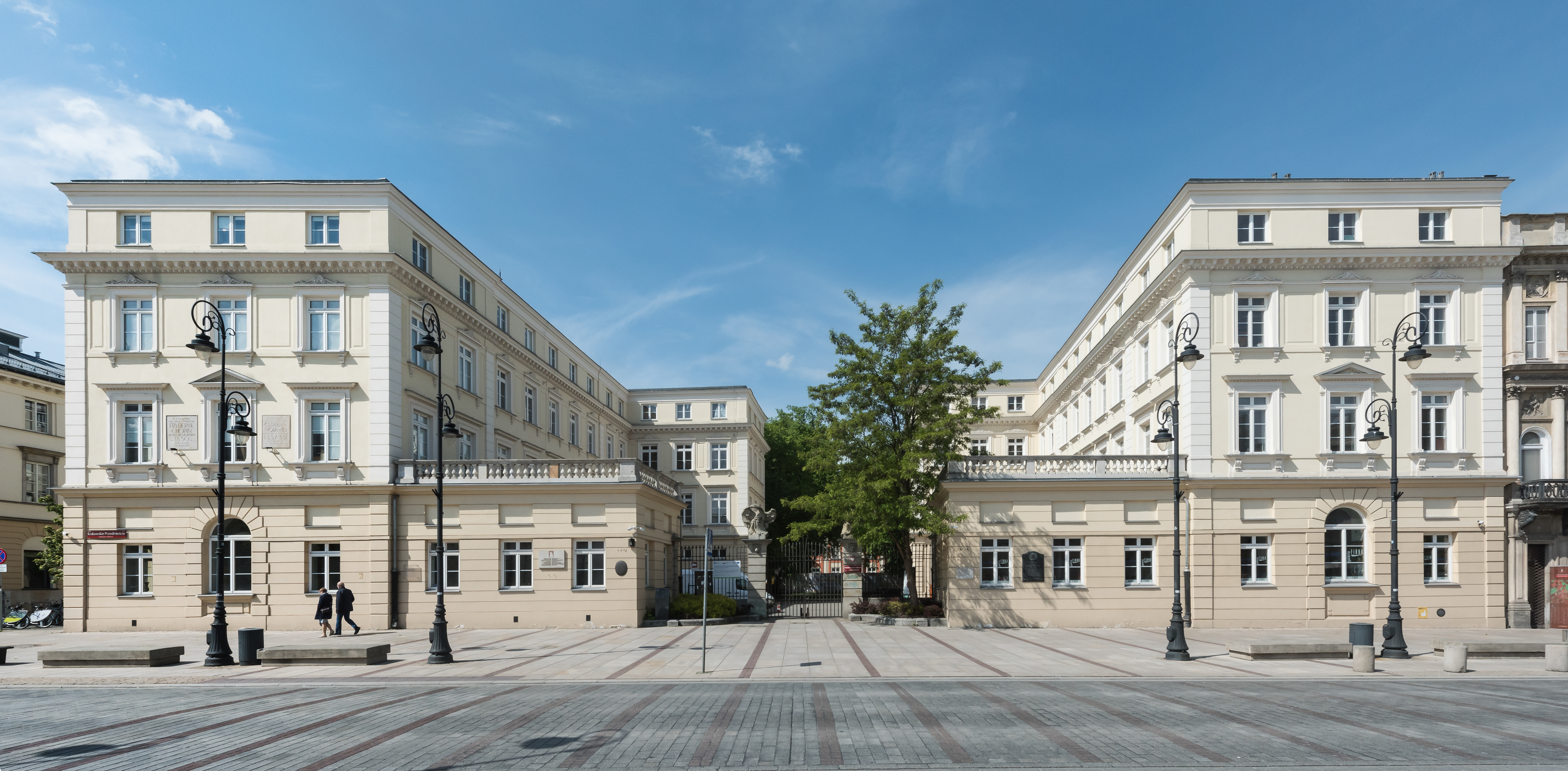
- Established: 1960
- Location: Warsaw, Poland
- Type: Biographical
- Public transit access: Nowy Świat-Uniwersytet
- Website: Fryderyk Chopin Museum

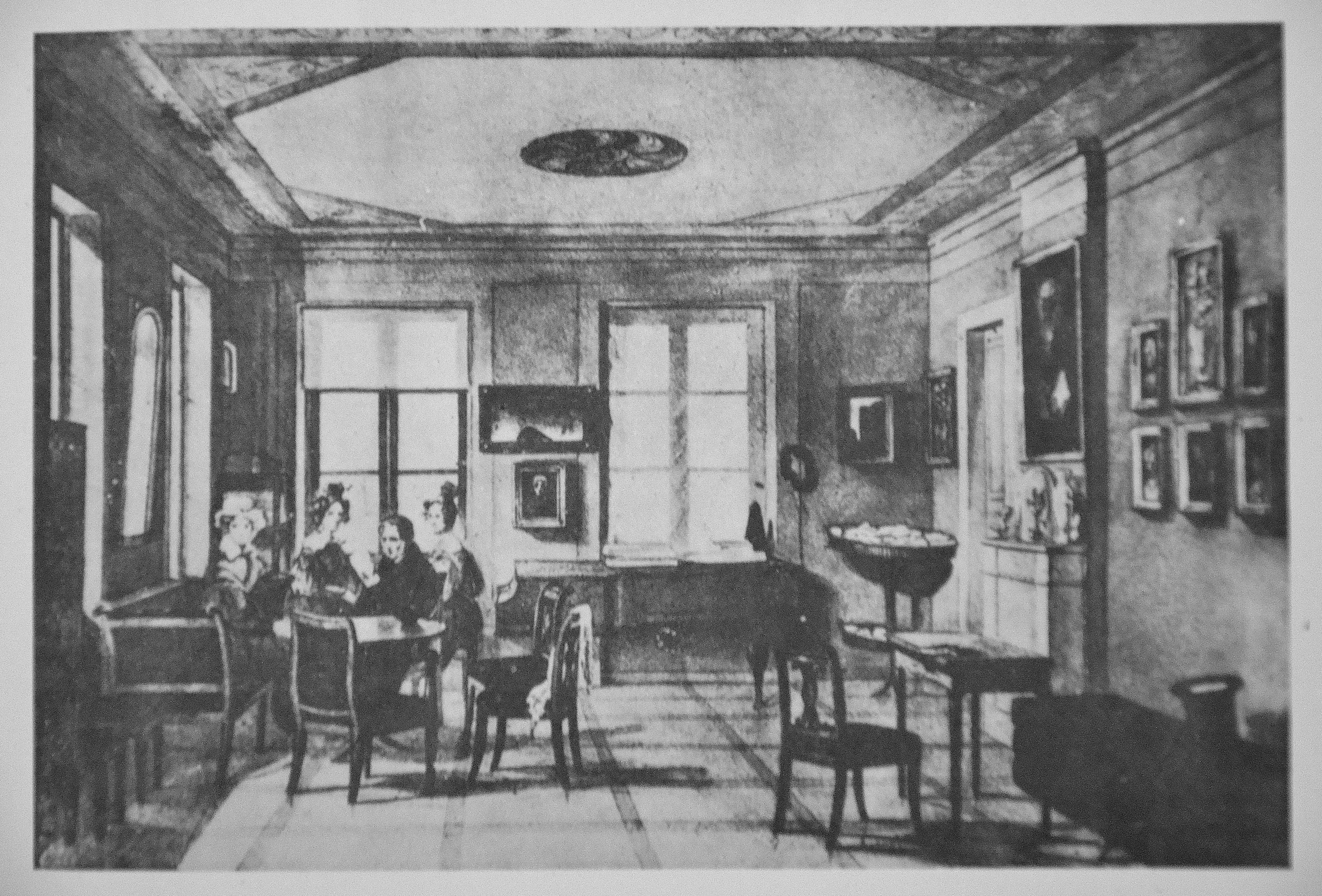
A room in the Chopins' Apartment on Krakowskie Przedmieście, by Antoni Kolberg, 1832

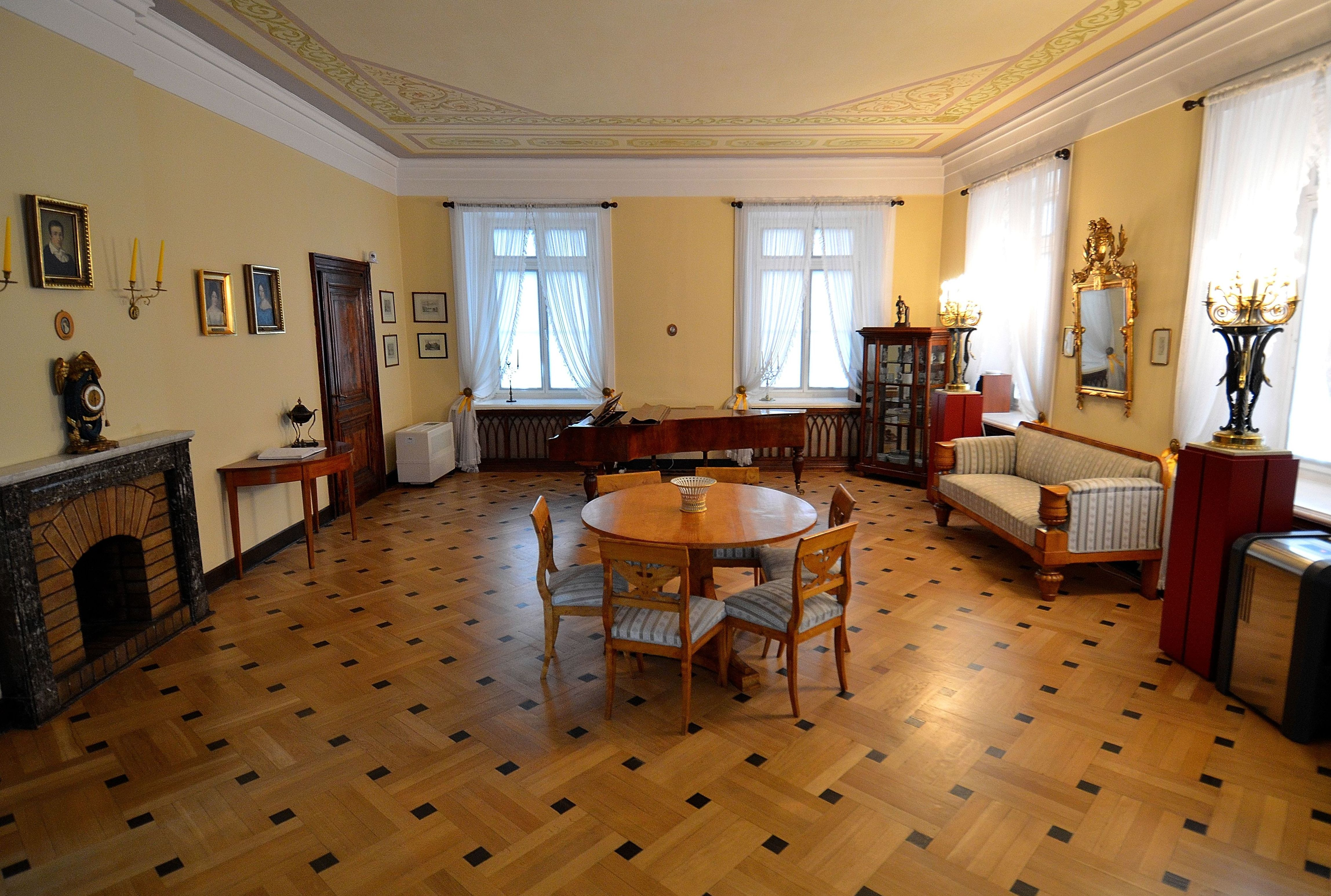
Chopin family parlor

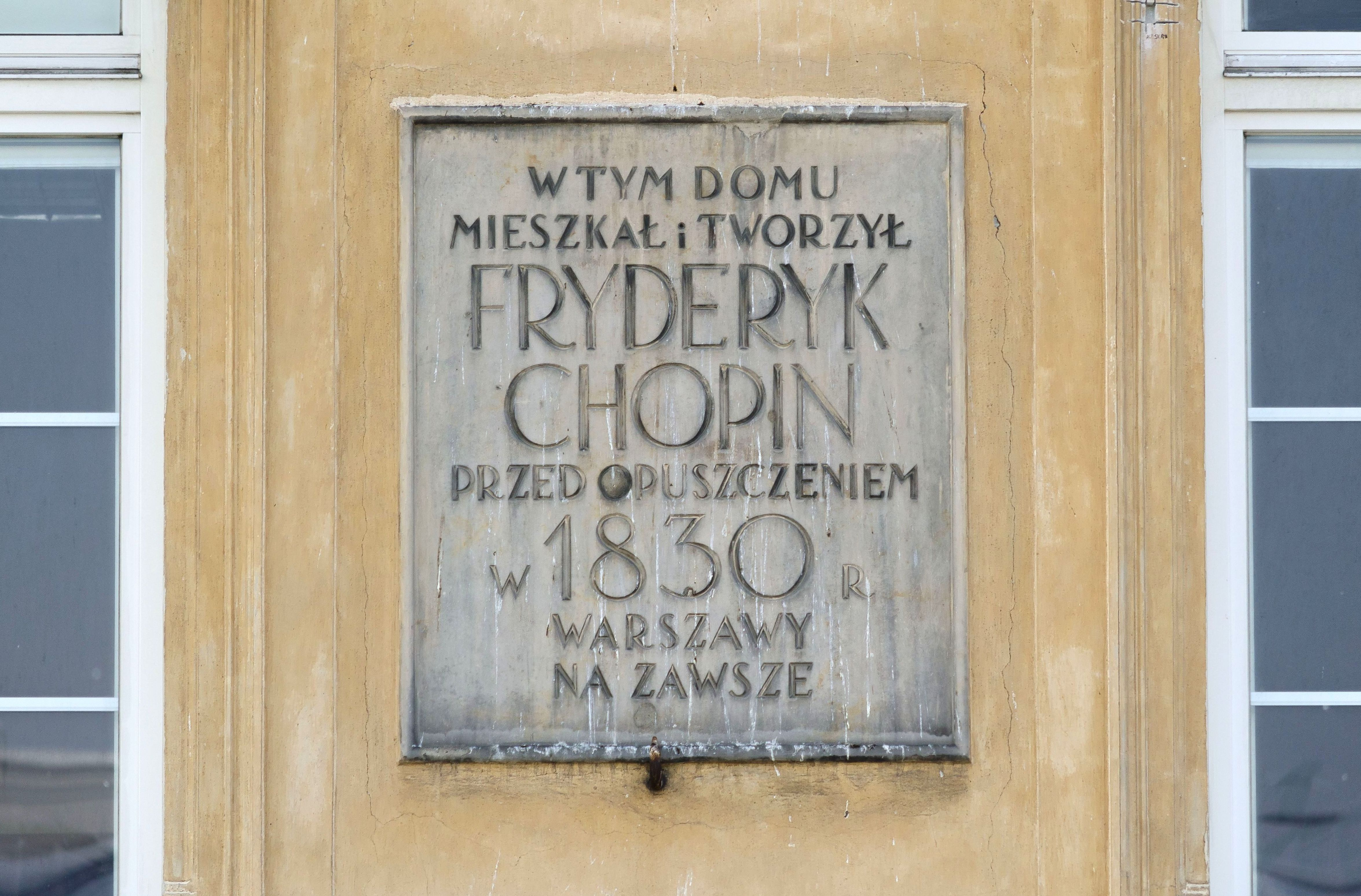
Plaque on Chopin apartment

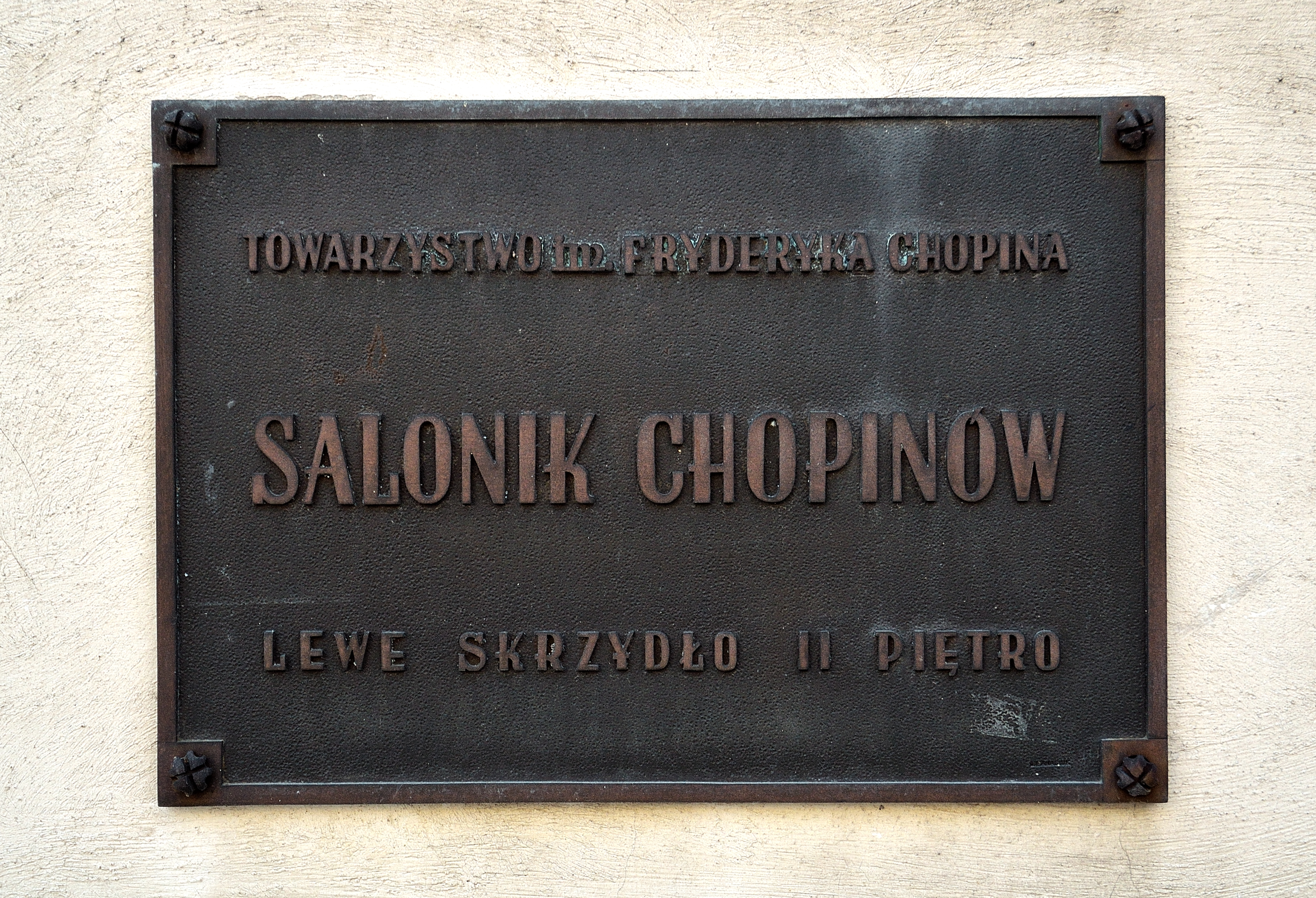
Plate near entrance to Graphics Department

The Chopin Family Parlor (Polish: Salonik Chopinów) was a branch of the Fryderyk Chopin Museum. It was located in the south annex of the Czapski Palace at 5 Krakowskie Przedmieście in Warsaw, Poland. It was the largest room of the former Chopin family apartment where Frédéric Chopin lived with his parents and sisters until he left Poland in 1830.

The museum was closed in 2014.

== History ==
The family moved to the Czapski Palace (then called the Krasiński Palace) from a Warsaw University building, across the street, in June 1827, just a few weeks after the death of Frédéric's youngest sister, Emilia. Her death was the reason for the move, as it was emotionally difficult for the family to remain in the apartment that had witnessed her decline and death.

The new apartment comprised two levels. The family lived in a large second-floor flat, and the garret served as a boarding house for male students. The latter was run by Frédéric's father, Nicolas Chopin. In a letter to his friend Tytus Wojciechowski dated 27 December 1828, Frédéric mentioned that one of the former boarding-school rooms had been turned into a study for him. It contained only a desk and piano; it has not been reconstructed.

It was in the Czapski (Krasiński) Palace that Frédéric Chopin composed and first played for family and friends some of his most important youthful works, including Piano Concerto No. 1 in E minor, Op. 11, and Piano Concerto No. 2 in F minor, Op. 21. Frequent visitors included Józef Elsner, Samuel Linde, Juliusz Kolberg, Kajetan Koźmian, Julian Ursyn Niemcewicz, and Stefan Witwicki.

On 2 November 1930 a commemorative plaque was unveiled between the windows of the annex second floor (viewed from the Krakowskie Przedmieście side). The inscription in Polish reads:

Frédéric Chopin lived and composed in this house before he left Warsaw forever in 1830.

The Czapski Palace was destroyed during World War II and reconstructed in 1948–59.

== Exhibition ==
The small museum occupied just one room on the second floor of the building that housed the Graphics Department of the Warsaw Academy of Fine Arts. The interior was designed by Barbara Brukalska, based on an 1832 drawing by Antoni Kolberg. None of the apartment's original furnishings have survived.

The exhibition included:

- a piano, built in the first half of the 19th century in Warsaw by Fryderyk Buchholtz, which belonged to Franz Liszt;
- an upright Pleyel piano, built in Paris in 1855;
- an Empire secretary desk built circa 1810-20 (from the collection of Krystyna Gołębiewska, great-great-granddaughter of Frédéric Chopin's sister, Ludwika Jedrzejewicz; and
- an Empire-style round birch table, set of chairs, sofa, and gold-framed mirror.

There were copies of portraits of members of the Chopin family, as well as two caricatures drawn by Chopin, and pictures of 19th-century Warsaw. There is also a fireplace.

The museum was opened in February 1960, during Chopin Year celebrations. It was closed by the Warsaw Academy of Fine Arts in 2014.

== See also ==
- List of music museums
- Birthplace of Frédéric Chopin

== Bibliography ==
- Hoesick, Ferdynand (1967). Chopin. Życie i twórczość Tom. I Warszawa 1810-1931 (in Polish). Kraków: Polskie Wydawnictwo Muzyczne. pp. 124–125.
- Majewski, Jerzy (2010). Book of Walks. Warsaw in Chopin's Footsteps. Warszawa: Agora SA. pp. 48–50. ISBN 978-83-7552-992-0.
