= Czapski Palace =

Palace in Warsaw, Poland

Czapski Palace Pałac Czapskich w Warszawie (in Polish)
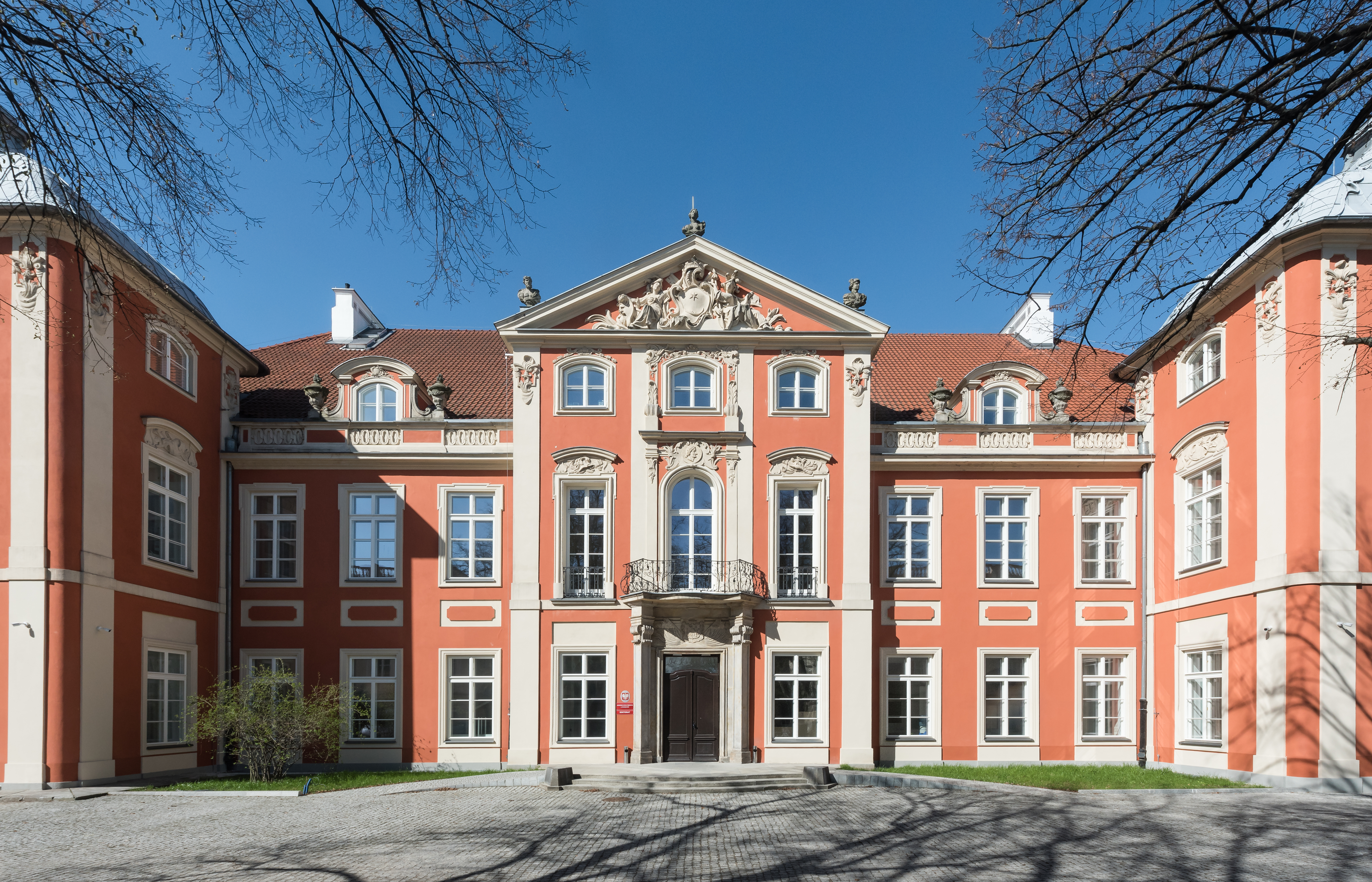
- Czapski Palace
- Interactive map of the Czapski Palace; Pałac Czapskich w Warszawie (in Polish) area

General information
- Architectural style: Rococo
- Location: Warsaw, Poland
- Coordinates: 52°14′22″N 21°0′54″E
- Construction started: 1686
- Completed: 1705
- Demolished: 1939

Design and construction
- Architect: Tylman Gamerski

Historic Monument of Poland
- Designated: 8 September 1994
- Part of: Warsaw – historic city center with the Royal Route and Wilanów
- Reference no.: M.P. 1994 nr 50 poz. 423

The Czapski Palace (Polish: Pałac Czapskich, IPA: [ˈpawat͡s ˈt͡ʂapskʲix], formerly also known as the Krasiński, Sieniawski or Raczyński Palace) is a palatial complex in the center of Warsaw, located at 5 Krakowskie Przedmieście. It was constructed in about 1686 for the Catholic Primate of Poland, Michał Stefan Radziejowski, using a design by the Dutch-born Polish architect and engineer Tylman van Gameren. It was reconstructed between 1712 and 1721, and acquired its present rococo character in 1752–65.

The building, just across the street from the University of Warsaw, has been home to famous persons including artist Zygmunt Vogel, composer Frédéric Chopin, and poets Zygmunt Krasiński and Cyprian Norwid. The palace now houses the Warsaw Academy of Fine Arts.

== History ==
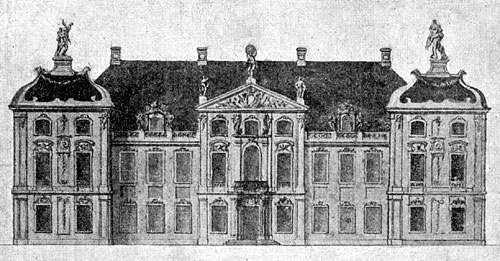
Façade Principale du Palais de Son Excellence Monseigneur le Comte Czapski, Staroste de Kniszyn à Warsowie, 1750s.

"Czapski Palace" is the name most often applied to the building, but in reference to subsequent residents it is also sometimes called the Krasiński, Sieniawski or Raczyński Palace. The building has also been owned by the Radziwiłłs, Radziejowskis, Zamoyskis and Czartoryskis.

Now the home of the Warsaw Academy of Fine Arts, the Czapski Palace dates from the late 17th century. It was constructed in about 1686 to Tylman van Gameren's design for Michał Stefan Radziejowski, Archbishop of Gniezno and Cardinal Primate. Between 1712 and 1721 it was reconstructed by Agostino Locci and Kacper Bażanka (alcoves and breaks were added) for the next owner, Great Crown Hetman Adam Mikołaj Sieniawski. In 1733 it was purchased by Aleksander Czartoryski, as a dowry for his daughter Maria who married her cousin Thomas Czapski (1711-1761). Its present rococo character dates from 1752–65, when the palace belonged to the Czapski family. At that time, the Krakowskie Przedmieście entrance was decorated with eagles and allegorical figures of the Four Seasons.

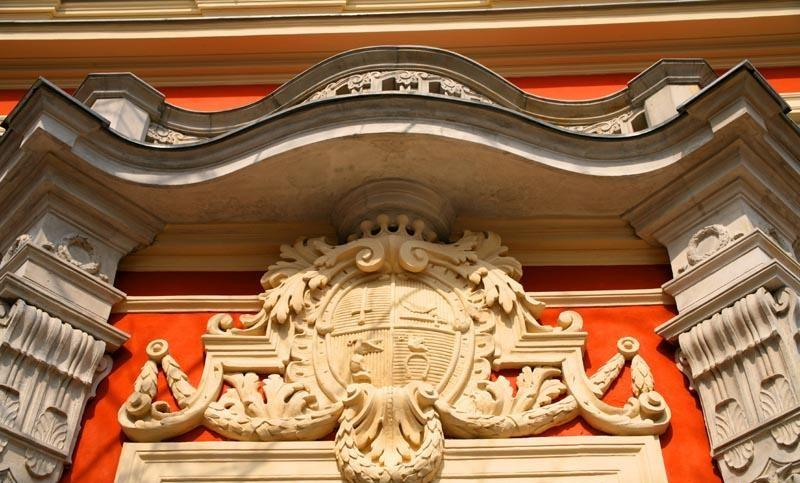
Krasiński coat-of-arms over main entrance

The Czapski Palace changed owners at least ten times. It was the residence of Stanisław Małachowski, Marshal of the Sejm, who in 1791 co-authored the world's second, and Europe's first, codified written national constitution—the Constitution of 3 May 1791. Małachowski and his wife Konstancja, née Czapska (daughter of Thomas Czapski), in the mid-eighteenth century remodeled the palace into a French-style city palace. Added around the turn of the eighteenth and nineteenth centuries were two classicist annexes designed by Jan Chrystian Kamsetzer. Another famous resident of the palace (1808–26) was Zygmunt Vogel, an artist who specialized in watercolor and drawing and was a professor in the University of Warsaw Department of Fine Arts.

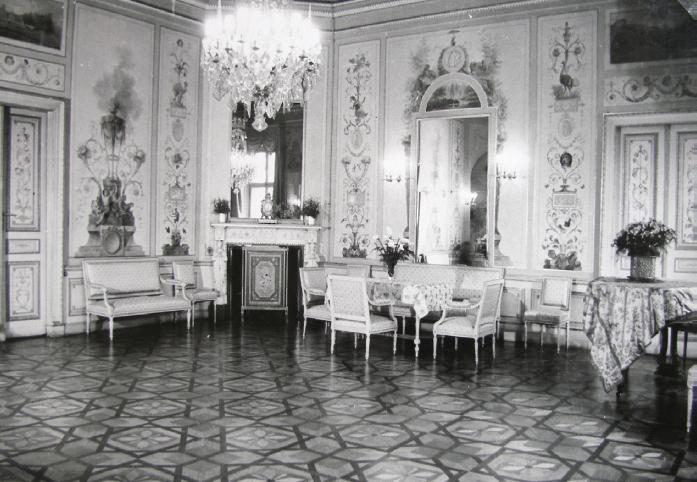
Ballroom, neoclassical paneling, before 1939

In the first half of the nineteenth century, the palace was acquired by Wincenty Krasiński. Zygmunt Krasiński, the Polish romantic poet, was born here in 1812. In 1827–30 Fryderyk Chopin lived here with his family in the building's south annex, on Krakowskie Przedmieście; the Palace was Chopin's last home before he went into exile. In 1837–39 it would be home to poet Cyprian Norwid, author of "Chopin's Piano" about the Russian troops' 1863 defenestration of the instrument. In 1851–52 the palace was rebuilt by Enrico Marconi. From 1909 to the outbreak of World War II, the building belonged to Edward Raczyński, future President (1979–86) of the Republic of Poland in Exile.

The palace burned in 1939 after being shelled by German artillery, and priceless paintings and books are thought to have been destroyed. It was reconstructed in 1948-59 to a design by Stanisław Brukalski. After restoration, the palace was incorporated into the Warsaw Academy of Fine Arts.

== Today ==
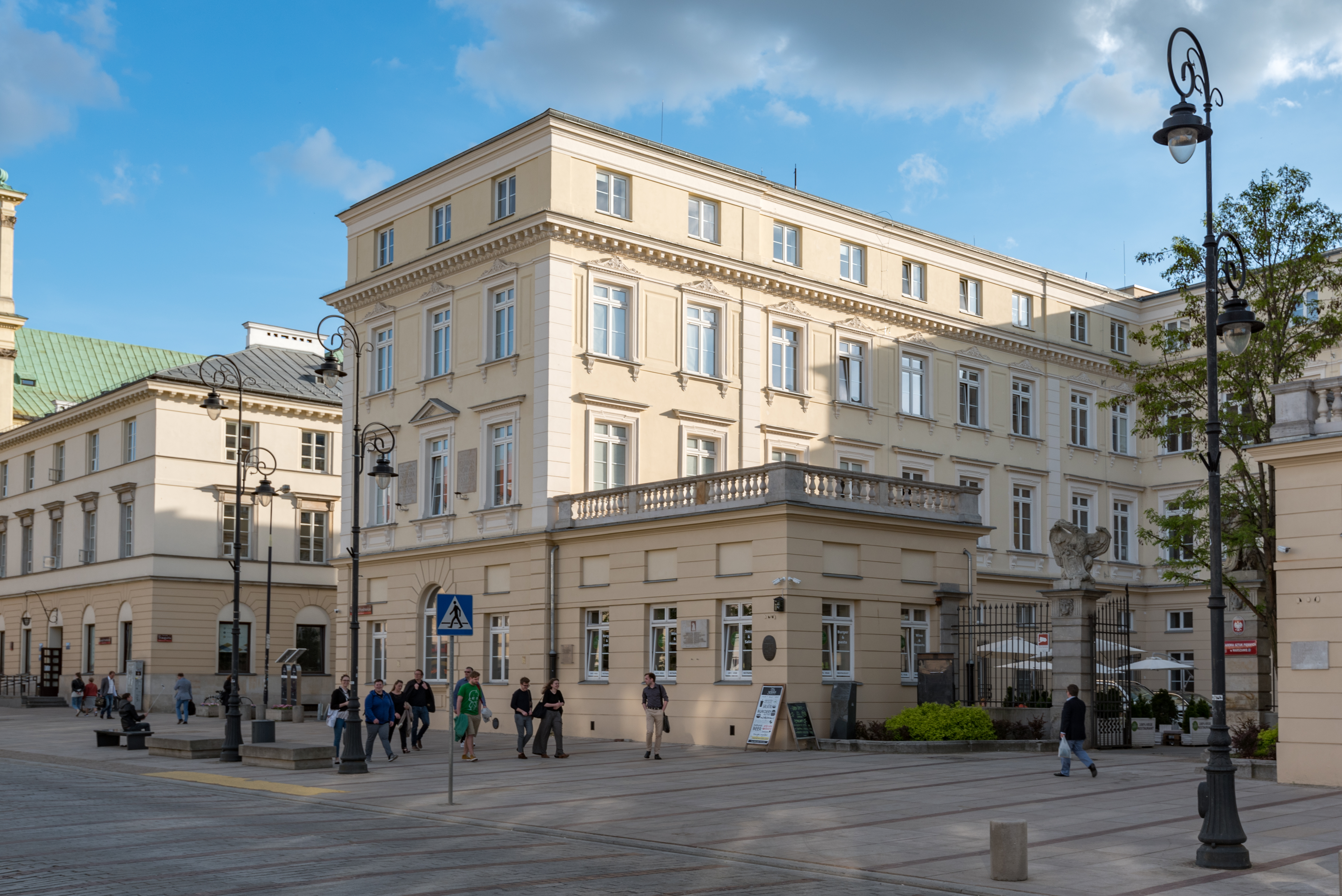
Main gate flanked by annexes, seen from Krakowskie Przedmieście. In south annex (pictured), on 2nd floor, is Chopin family parlor.

In the courtyard before the Palace stands a copy of Andrea del Verrocchio's equestrian statue of the Venetian condottiere Bartolomeo Colleoni.

In the south annex to the Palace, facing directly onto Krakowskie Przedmieście, a large second-floor room, the Chopin Family Parlor (Salonik Chopinów), features period furniture and memorabilia of the composer. The parlor's interior and decor, from the first half of the nineteenth century, have been reconstructed from sketches made in 1832 by Antoni Kolberg. The parlor is open to the public.

The Academy of Fine Arts museum that opened in 1985 holds 30,000 works from all fields of visual art; painting, sculpture, graphics, drawing, posters, architecture, artistic crafts, and industrial design. The museum is located in the Palace's attic. The collections are held in 200 square metres of storage rooms, while the exhibition rooms host meetings, lectures and temporary displays.

== See also ==
- Branicki Palace, Warsaw
- Brühl Palace, Warsaw
- Krasiński Palace (aka "Palace of the Commonwealth")
