= Edmund Runowicz =

Retired engineer and past mayor of Szczecin, Poland

Mayor of Szczecin
- In office 29 May 2001 – 21 November 2002
- Preceded by: Marek Koćmiel
- Succeeded by: Marian Jurczyk

Deputy mayor of Szczecin
- In office 1988–1990

Personal details
- Born: 17 January 1953 (age 73) Szczecin, Poland
- Education: Szczecin University of Technology
- Occupation: Engineer; Politician; Government official; Business executive

Edmund Kazimierz Runowicz (Polish: [ˈɛd.munt kaˈʑi.mjɛʂ ruˈnɔ.vit͡ʂ]; born 17 January 1953) is a retired engineer, politician and government official. He was a mayor of Szczecin, Poland from 2001 to 2002.

== Biography ==
Edmund Runowicz was born on 17 January 1953 in Szczecin, Poland. In 1978 he had graduated from the Faculty of the Engineering and Economics of the Szczecin University of Technology with the master engineer's degree in transportation.

From 1978 to 1980, he worked in the Szczecin Shipyard. He was a commander of the Szczecin division of the Polish Scouting and Guiding Association from 1980 to 1986, and its deputy chief from 1986 to 1989.

Runowicz was a deputy mayor of social matters of Szczecin from 1988 to 1990. On 12 September 1994, the city council appointed him as the city secretary, and on 29 May 2001, as the mayor. He was in the office until 21 November 2002. He run for the reelection in the 2002 local election, as a nonpartisan candidate, supported by the electoral committee of the Democratic Left Alliance and Labour Union. In the first turn, he had received 23.8% of votes (24,199 votes), moving to the second turn where he lost against Marian Jurczyk, receiving 46.57% of votes (47,049 votes).

In 2003, he became a deputy chairperson of the Szczecin-based petrol company Ship-Service.
