= Equestrian statue of Bartolomeo Colleoni (Venice) =

Sculpture by Andrea del Verrocchio in Venice, Italy

- Monumento a Bartolomeo Colleoni
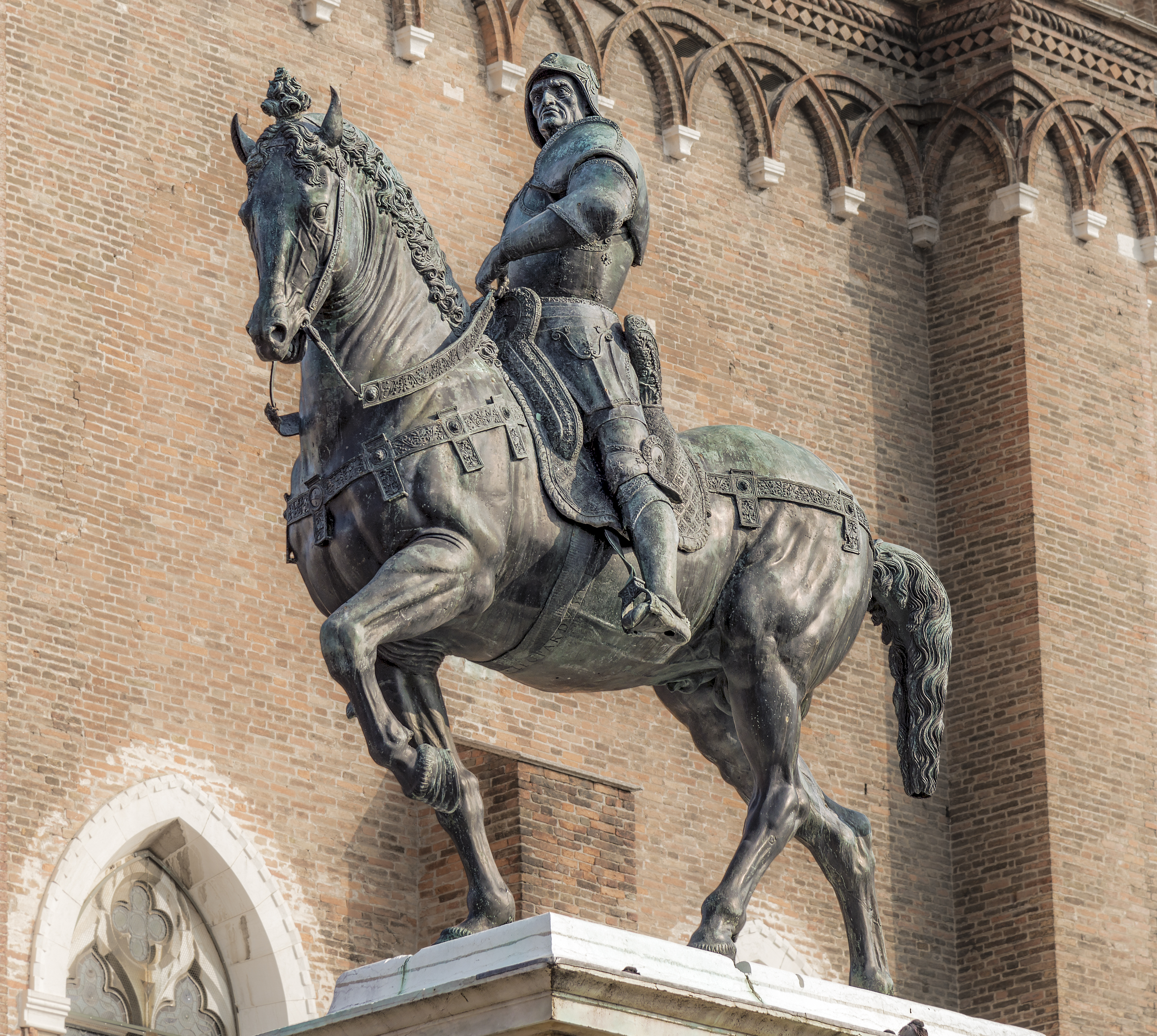
- Interactive map of Equestrian statue of Bartolomeo Colleoni
- Location: Campo Santi Giovanni e Paolo, Venice, Italy
- Coordinates: 45°26′21″N 12°20′29″E
- Designer: Andrea del Verrocchio (sculptor); Alessandro Leopardi (casting and pedestal)
- Type: Equestrian statue
- Material: Bronze
- Height: 395 cm (statue only)
- Beginning date: 1480
- Dedicated to: Bartolomeo Colleoni

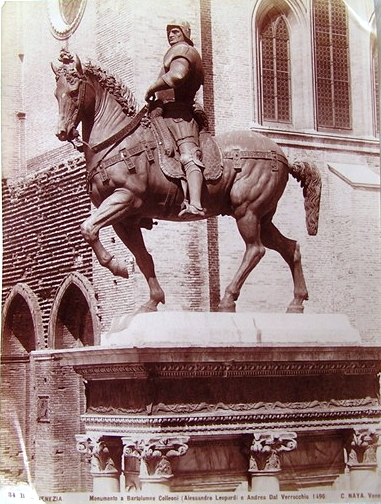
19th-century photo of the statue

The equestrian statue of Bartolomeo Colleoni is a Renaissance sculpture in Campo Santi Giovanni e Paolo, Venice, Italy, created by Andrea del Verrocchio in 1480–1488. Portraying the condottiero Bartolomeo Colleoni (who served for a long time under the Republic of Venice), it has a height of 395 cm excluding the pedestal. It is the second major equestrian statue of the Italian Renaissance, after Donatello's equestrian statue of Gattamelata (1453).

== History ==
In 1475, the Condottiero Colleoni, a former Captain General of the Republic of Venice, died and by his will left a substantial part of his estate to the Republic on condition that a statue of himself should be commissioned and set up in the Piazza San Marco. In 1479 the Republic announced that it would accept the legacy, but that (as statues were not permitted in the Piazza) the statue would be placed in the open space in front of the Scuola of San Marco. A competition was arranged to enable a sculptor to be selected. Three sculptors competed for the contract, Verrocchio from Florence, Alessandro Leopardi from Venice and Bartolomeo Vellano from Padua. Verrocchio made a model of his proposed sculpture using wood and black leather, while the others made models of wax and terracotta. The three models were exhibited in Venice in 1483 and the contract was awarded to Verrocchio. He then opened a workshop in Venice and made the final wax model which was ready to be cast in bronze, but he died in 1488, before this was done.

He had asked that his pupil Lorenzo di Credi, who was then in charge of his workshop in Florence, should be entrusted with the finishing of the statue, but the Venetian state after considerable delay commissioned Alessandro Leopardi to do this. In 1496, the statue was erected on a pedestal made by Leopardi in the Campo SS. Giovanni e Paolo, where it stands today.

== Description ==
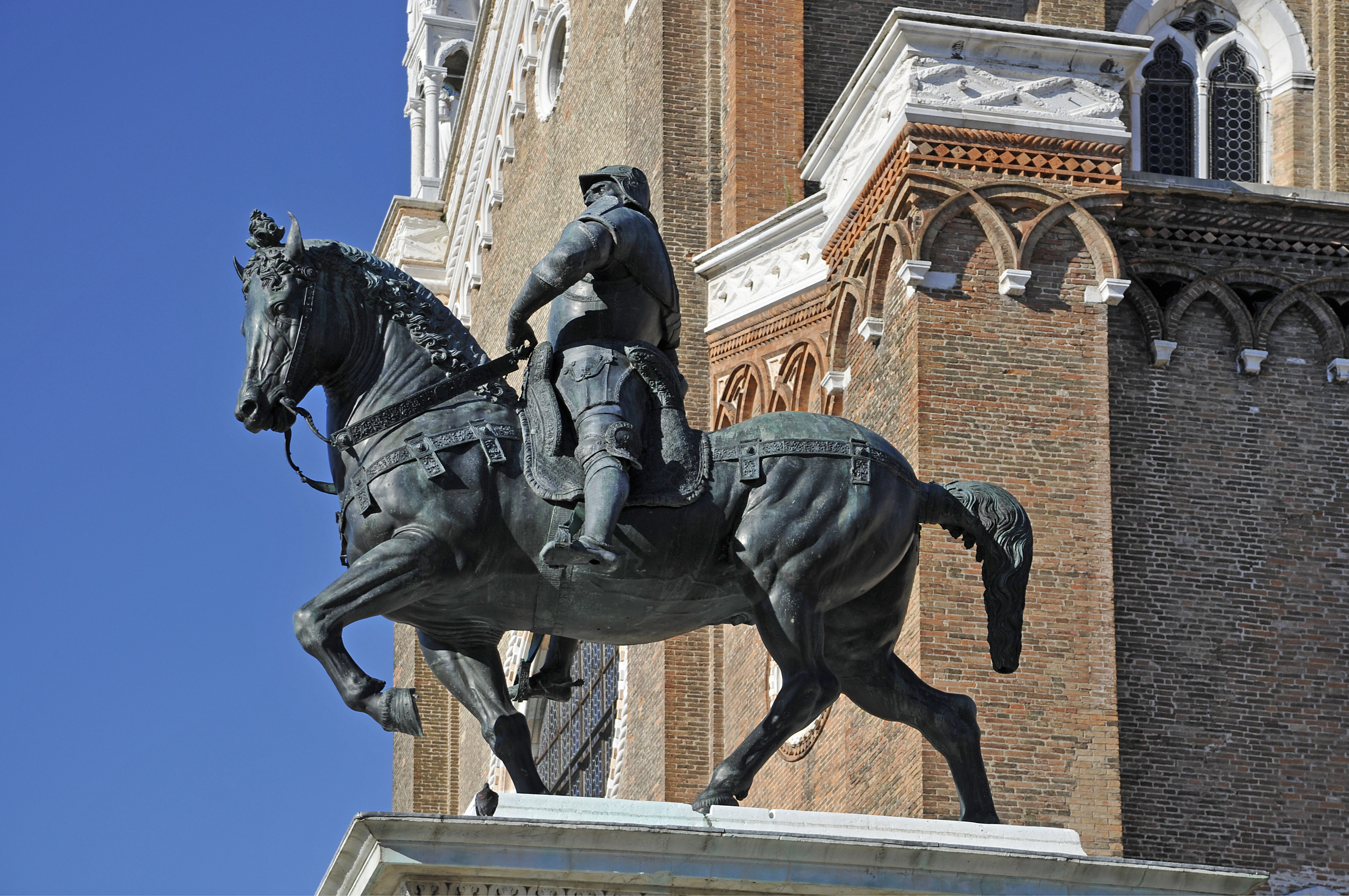
Another view

Verrocchio based the sculpture on Donatello's statue of Gattamelata, as well as on the ancient statue of Marcus Aurelius in Rome, the St. Mark's Horses in Venice, the Regisole (a late antiquity work in Pavia, now lost), and the frescoes of the Funerary Monument to Sir John Hawkwood by Paolo Uccello and of the Equestrian Monument of Niccolò da Tolentino by Andrea del Castagno.

The main problem he had to face was of statics: representing the horse while moving, with a raised leg, could cause stability problems due to the excessive weight of the bronze being supported only by three relatively thin legs. Donatello, in his monument at Padua, had partially solved the problem by putting the raised leg on a sphere. Verrocchio was the first to solve the problem in having the horse supported by three legs.

Although it was not placed where Colleoni had intended, art historian Passavent emphasised how fine it looks in its actual position, writing that "the magnificent sense of movement in this figure is shown to superb advantage in its present setting" and that, as sculpture, "it far surpasses anything the century had yet aspired to or thought possible". He points out that both man and horse are equally fine and together are inseparable parts of the sculpture.

Verrocchio is unlikely to have ever seen Colleoni and the statue is not a portrait of the man but of the idea of a strong and ruthless military commander "bursting with titanic power and energy". This is in contrast to Donatello's statue at Padua of the condottiere known as Gattamelata with its "air of calm command" and all Verrocchio's effort "has been devoted to the rendering of movement and of a sense of strain and energy".

== Copies ==
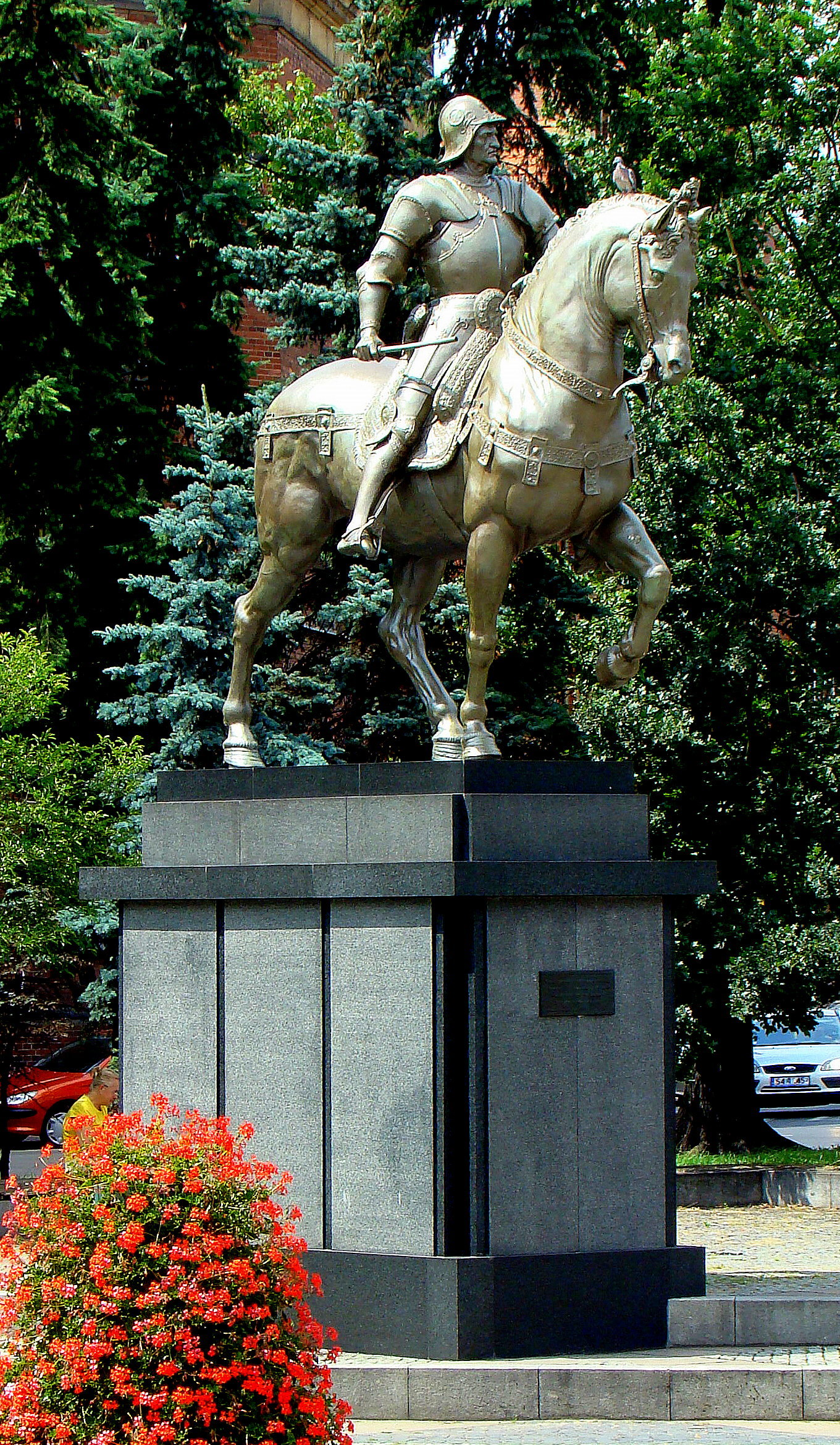
Bartolomeo Colleoni Monument at Lotników Square, Szczecin, Poland

In 1909 an electrotype copy of the statue was made for the cast and copy sculpture collection of what would become the National Museum in Szczecin, Poland. That copy was moved to Warsaw in 1948, where it was eventually installed outside the Academy of Fine Arts as an inspiration to students. In 1992 the City of Szczecin petitioned for the return of the copy, which was granted in 2001, and in 2002 it was installed in Szczecin's Plac Lotników (Airmen's Square) and unveiled by the President of Szczecin and Colleoni's descendant, lawyer Guardo Colleoni. A condition of the return of the copy to Szczecin was that a copy of that copy be made to remain outside the Academy of Fine Arts in Warsaw, where a bronze copy of the electrotype copy stands today.

Another copy of the statue stands in Montevideo, Uruguay, in front of the School of Architecture of the University of the Republic.

== See also ==
- List of public art in Venice

== Sources ==
- Zuffi, Stefano (2007). Grande atlante del Rinascimento. Milan: Electa. ISBN 978-88-370-4898-3.
- Passavant, Gunter (1969). Verrochio Sculptures Paintings & Drawings. London: Phaidon.
- Pope-Hennessy, John (1958). Italian Renaissance Sculpture. London.
