= Leonardo (2021 TV series) =

Italian-British-French-Spanish TV series

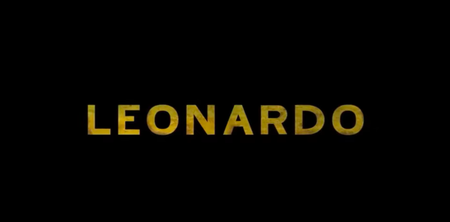
- Genre: Historical drama
- Created by: Frank Spotnitz; Steve Thompson
- Directed by: Dan Percival; Alexis Sweet
- Starring: Aidan Turner; Matilda De Angelis; James D'Arcy; Alessandro Sperduti; Robin Renucci; Gabriel Lo Giudice; Josafat Vagni; Massimo De Santis; Giancarlo Giannini; Freddie Highmore; Carlos Cuevas; Giovanni Scifoni
- Composer: John Paesano
- Country of origin: Italy
- Original language: English
- No. of series: 1
- No. of episodes: 8

Production
- Executive producers: Frank Spotnitz; Steve Thompson; Luca Bernabei; Matilde Bernabei; Freddie Highmore
- Running time: 52 minutes
- Production companies: Lux Vide; Big Light Productions; Rai Fiction; Sony Pictures Television; France Télévisions; RTVE; Alfresco Pictures

Original release
- Network: Rai 1
- Release: 23 March – 13 April 2021

Leonardo is a historical drama television series created by Frank Spotnitz and Steve Thompson. The series was produced by Lux Vide in collaboration with Rai Fiction, Sony Pictures Entertainment, with Frank Spotnitz's Big Light Productions and Freddie Highmore's Alfresco Pictures in association with France Télévisions and RTVE. The series recounts Leonardo da Vinci's extraordinary life through the works that made him famous and through the stories hidden within those works, revealing little by little the inner torments of a man obsessed with attaining perfection.

In March 2021, it was announced that Leonardo was renewed for a second season. However, in August 2024, it was reported that there were no current plans for further seasons beyond the first.

== Plot ==
In 1506, Leonardo da Vinci, the most famous artist of his time, is accused of the murder of Caterina da Cremona. Questioned by Stefano Giraldi, an ambitious officer of the Duchy of Milan, Leonardo begins to tell his life, starting from the first meeting with Caterina in Andrea del Verrocchio's workshop. Giraldi, fascinated by the artist's personality, begins to suspect that Leonardo may be innocent and investigates to discover the truth.

== Cast and characters ==
=== Main ===
- Aidan Turner as Leonardo da Vinci.
- Matilda De Angelis as Caterina da Cremona (Leonardo's friend and muse).
- James D'Arcy as Ludovico Sforza, known as Il Moro (Duke of Milan).
- Alessandro Sperduti as Tommaso Masini (Leonardo's assistant).
- Robin Renucci as Piero da Vinci (Leonardo's father).
- Gabriel Lo Giudice as Marco (Leonardo's assistant).
- Josafat Vagni as Giulio (Leonardo's assistant).
- Andrew Knott as Alfonso (Verrocchio's assistant).
- Massimo De Santis as Rinaldo Rossi (Giraldi's boss).
- Giancarlo Giannini as Andrea del Verrocchio (Leonardo's teacher).
- Freddie Highmore as Stefano Giraldi (Officer of the Duchy of Milan investigating the murder case in which Leonardo is involved).
- Carlos Cuevas as Salaì, nickname of Gian Giacomo Caprotti (Leonardo's assistant).
- Giovanni Scifoni as Luca Pacioli (Friar in Milan who urges Leonardo to paint L'Ultima Cena).
- Max Bennett as Cesare Borgia (Condottiero conquering Romagna).
- Claudio Castrogiovanni as Ramiro (Military commander under Cesare Borgia).
- Antonio De Matteo as Galeazzo Sanseverino (Military commander and right-hand man of Il Moro).

=== Recurring ===
- Flavio Parenti as Bernardo Bembo (Venetian ambassador at the Duchy of Milan).
- Sergio Albelli as Amerigo Benci (Businessman close to the Medici and Leonardo's patron).
- Poppy Gilbert as Ginevra de' Benci (Amerigo's daughter and Leonardo's muse for her portrait).
- Miriam Dalmazio as Beatrice D’Este (Duchess of Milan and wife of Ludovico Sforza).
- Edan Hayhurst as Gian Galeazzo Sforza (Young Duke of Milan).
- Corrado Invernizzi as Pier Soderini (Gonfaloniere of the Republic of Florence and committent of Battaglia di Anghiari).
- Davide Iacopini as Niccolò Machiavelli.
- Maria Vera Ratti as Lisa del Giocondo (Leonardo's Muse for La Gioconda).
- Pierpaolo Spollon as Michelangelo Buonarroti.

== Episodes ==
No.	Title	Directed by	Written by	Original release date
1	Episode 1	Dan Percival	Frank Spotnitz, Steve Thompson	23 March 2021
Milan, 1506. Leonardo is arrested for poisoning Caterina de Cremona. After protesting his innocence to Stefano Giraldi, Leonardo remembers back to his days as an apprentice in Andrea del Verrocchio's studio, where he first meets Caterina.
2	Episode 2	Dan Percival	Frank Spotnitz	23 March 2021
With Leonardo's successes recognised and his reputation growing, a risky decision sets to destroy everything he has worked for. Leonardo receives support through new commissions (the Portrait of Ginevra de Benci and The Adoration of the Magi), but pays the price for his actions.
3	Episode 3	Dan Percival	Gabbie Asher	30 March 2021
Leonardo ventures to Milan with a determination to claim an offer of patronage from the Duke Regent, Ludovico Sforza. When the reality of the situation turns out to be less appealing and he is assigned to produce a big theatrical entertainment instead of a painting, a newfound relationship helps liberate Leonardo's imagination.
4	Episode 4	Dan Percival	Steve Thompson	30 March 2021
When Ludovico asks Leonardo to create a sculpture in honour of his father, Leonardo's ambitions rise as he tries to outperform. During the work, Leonardo finds himself in Gian Galeazzo Sforza, the young duke of Milan and puts trust in an unexpected source, Salaì, a resourceful thief. As he gets distracted from Caterina, Leonardo ends up in a race against time with a costly decision to make.
5	Episode 5	Alexis Sweet	Frank Spotnitz	6 April 2021
After the death of Ludovico's wife, he is given a new art commission but struggles with inner turmoil. After reflecting on wise words from Father Luca Pacioli, Leonardo seeks assistance from friends and presses on with the work, despite tensions in the city. Putting his creativity to the test and experimenting with a new technique, he must deal with the consequences of his actions and results.
6	Episode 6	Alexis Sweet	Steve Thompson	6 April 2021
Returning to Florence, an uninspired Leonardo accepts to paint the portrait of Lisa Gherardini, that will become the Mona Lisa. After failing to repair his relationship with Caterina, Leonardo goes to Imola, where he receives much praise from his employer, Cesare Borgia.
7	Episode 7	Dan Percival	Steve Thompson	13 April 2021
Reunited with Caterina, Leonardo perseveres with his work but is frustrated by the growing success of a younger artist, Michelangelo. Putting his feelings aside, Leonardo is persuaded to accept a new commission, a giant fresco of the Battle of Anghiari, but faces competition from his newfound rival.
8	Episode 8	Dan Percival	Frank Spotnitz	13 April 2021
Time is short as Stefano races to save Leonardo and uncovers his secret. With facts and no evidence, an epiphany leads Stefano going to a remote source for help. As the execution nears, Leonardo's life hangs by a thread. His guilt is upheld, and hope seems lost. Holding the fate of Milan's greatest artist in his hands, Stefano realises the answer he seeks lies in the man he is striving to save.

== Broadcast ==
The series premiered on 23 March 2021 on Rai 1. In the UK and Ireland, it aired on Amazon Prime Video on 16 April 2021. In India, the series premiered on SonyLIV on 9 April 2021. It aired in Canada on 15 April on Telus, while in Spain, on 3 June on RTVE. In March 2022, The CW picked up the series in the United States; it premiered on 16 August 2022 as part of the network's summer programming slate in the 2021–22 television season. China's Hunan TV aired the miniseries from 23 December 2024. The miniseries was aired on primetime slot of 7:30pm (right after Xinwen Lianbo), contrary to previous rules that non-China originated series cannot aired between 5pm to 10pm.

== See also ==
- Leonardo (2011 TV series)
- Cultural depictions of Leonardo da Vinci
- Personal life of Leonardo da Vinci
