= Dama col mazzolino =

Sculpture by Andrea del Verrocchio

- Gentildonna dalle belle mani
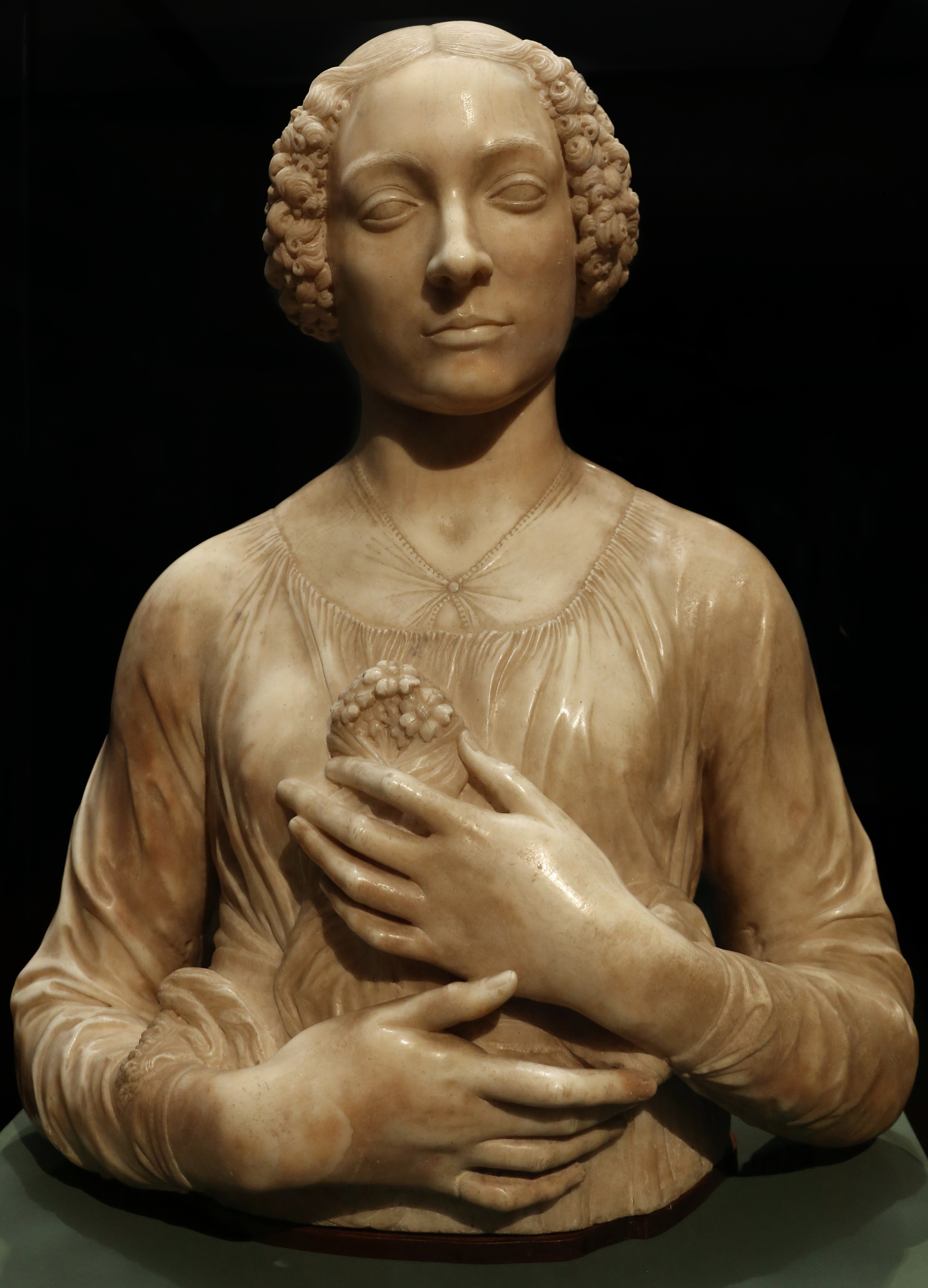
- Artist: Andrea del Verrocchio
- Year: 1475
- Dimensions: (60 cm (1 ft 11 1/2 in) in)
- Location: Bargello Museum, Florence

Woman with Flowers (Italian: Dama col mazzolino or Italian: Gentildonna dalle belle mani) is a marble sculpture 60 centimetres (24 in) in height executed by Andrea del Verrocchio between 1475 and 1480. It is in the Bargello Museum in Florence.

The sculpture stands out for being a bust of an almost half-length figure with fully realized arms and the hands on the chest. The hands are an additional and extraordinary feature, that confirm the elegant beauty of the portrayed.

The identity of the woman could be Fioretta Gorini, mistress of Giuliano de' Medici, Lucrezia Donati, platonic love of Lorenzo il Magnifico, or Ginevra d'Amerigo Benci, also portrayed in a painting by Leonardo da Vinci.

The Dama col mazzolino influenced Leonardo's studies of hands.

== Bibliography ==
- Nifosì, Giuseppe (2016). Arte in opera. Dal Rinascimento al Manierismo: Pittura Scultura Architettura. Vol. 3. Gius.Laterza & Figli Spa. p. 480. ISBN 9788842114321.
- Nifosì, Giuseppe (2014). L'arte svelata. Rinascimento Barocco Rococò (in Italian). Vol. 2. Gius.Laterza & Figli Spa. p. 414. ISBN 9788842113256.
