= Oil painting reproduction =

Oil painting reproductions are paintings that have been created by copying in oils an original oil painting by an artist.

Oil painting reproductions are distinct from original oil painting such as are often of interest to collectors and museums. Oil painting reproduction can, however, sometimes be regarded as artworks in themselves.

== Types ==
Oil painting reproductions can be labeled with several different categories, including:

- Studio of: created in the studio of a master artist, perhaps with their supervision or participation.
- Circle of: a work created by someone associated with the original artist, during or in the years immediately following the artist’s own lifetime.
- After: an exact or partial imitation of a known work by a famous artist.
- Style of: an interpretation of the artist’s style done by someone else at a later date.

== History ==
The traces of oil painting reproduction can be found starting in the 16th century. Traditionally, students of the Old Masters learned how to paint by working in the style of their teachers.

This process of mimicking their master’s work would enable a student to practice a skilled mode of painting before developing their own approach. Many famous artists employed this practice, including John Singer Sargent, Edgar Degas, and Pablo Picasso.

Perhaps the most well known of all students who learned by reproduction was Leonardo da Vinci. Beginning as an apprentice under the master sculptor and painter Andrea Del Verrocchio, Leonardo would have learned to paint in the style of the master himself. It is said that after Leonardo brilliantly aided Verrocchio in the painting of The Baptism of Christ, the master resolved to never touch a brush again

== Forms ==
- Oil on canvas
- Oil on panel
- Oil on copper

== Copyright issues ==
There are several issues related to art forgery and copyright violation that apply to the reproduction of oil paintings.

Copyright laws vary from country to country.

In the U.S., there is no copyright infringement that applies to a painting 70 years after the death of its artist.
