= Fioretta Gorini =

Italian noble (1453–1478)

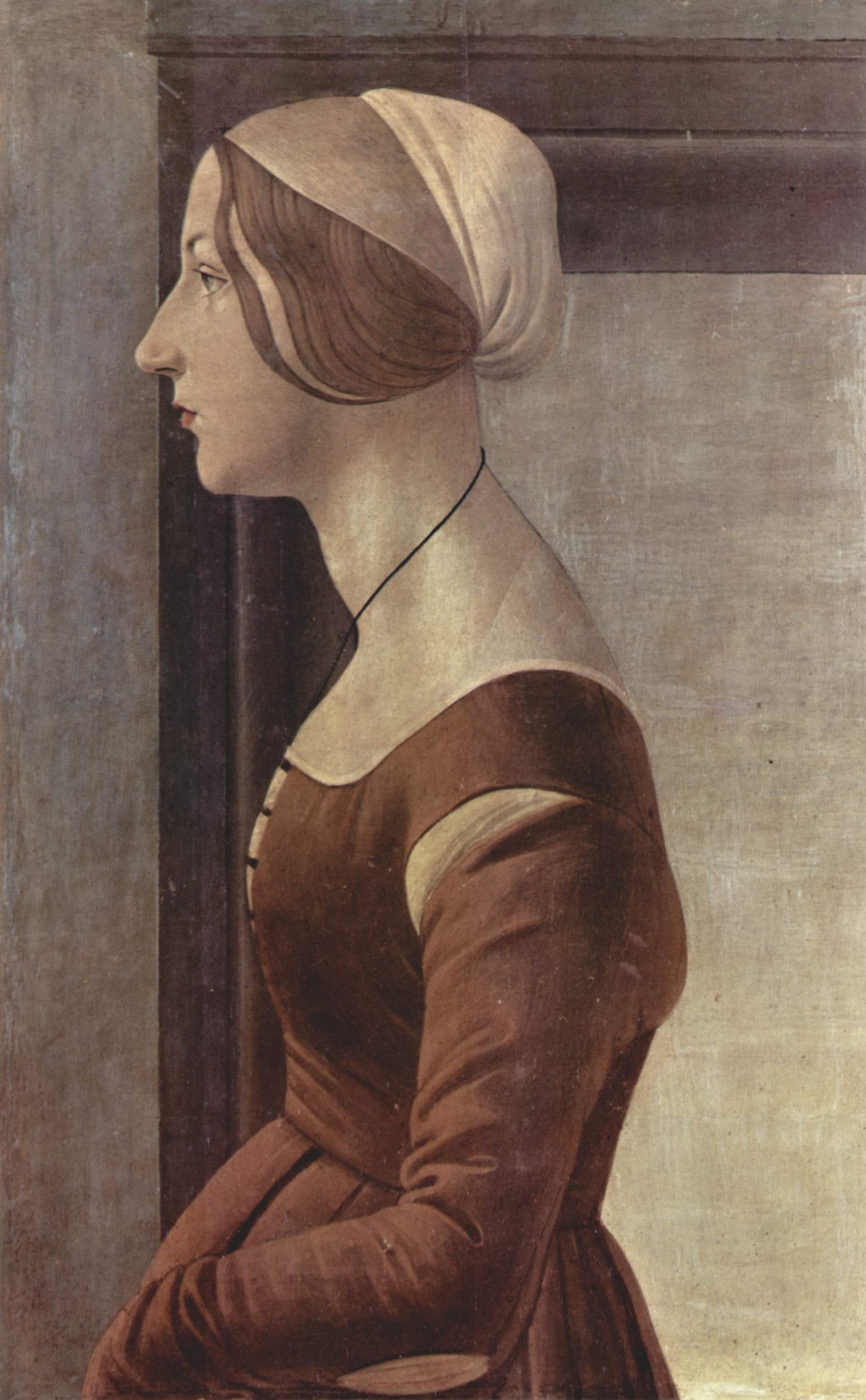
- Ritratto di giovane donna (1475) of Sandro Botticelli. It is preserved in Palazzo Pitti of Florence
- Born: 1453; Florence, Republic of Florence
- Died: 1478 (aged 24–25); Florence, Republic of Florence
- Issue: Pope Clement VII

Fioretta Gorini (1453/60 – possibly 1478) was the mistress of Giuliano de' Medici and the probable mother of Giulio de' Medici, the future Pope Clement VII. Gorini was the daughter of a professor, Antonio Gorini. Her actual name was Antonia or Antonietta, while Fioretta was a nickname given to her.

On 26 May 1478, a month after the assassination of Giuliano in the Pazzi conspiracy, Fioretta gave birth to his illegitimate son, Giulio. Not much of Gorini's life after her son's birth is known, and some records have her dying that same year. Giulio spent the first seven years of life with his godfather, architect Antonio da Sangallo the Elder.

The female figure of Fioretta may be represented in Ritratto di giovane donna (1475), of Sandro Botticelli, which is preserved in Palazzo Pitti, although it may equally represent Simonetta Vespucci, Clarice Orsini, Alfonsina Orsini or Lucrezia Tornabuoni. The woman sculpted on Dama col mazzolino (1475), of Andrea del Verrocchio, which is preserved in Museo Nazionale del Bargello, could be Fioretta Gorini. There has also been speculation that Gorini was the inspiration behind the Mona Lisa.

== Fictional depictions ==
Fioretta is portrayed by Chiara Baschetti in the 2016 television series, Medici: The Magnificent.
