= Giovanni Cianfanini =

Italian painter

Giovanni Cianfanini (1462–1542) was an Italian painter of the Renaissance, active in Florence. Little biographical information is known, except that he was the son of Benedetto Cianfanini, also a painter. Giovanni appears to have had a short apprenticeship with Sandro Botticelli, then been associated with the studio of Lorenzo di Credi in Florence. He mainly painted history, sacred subjects, and portraits.
