= Alessandro Leopardi =

Italian sculptor

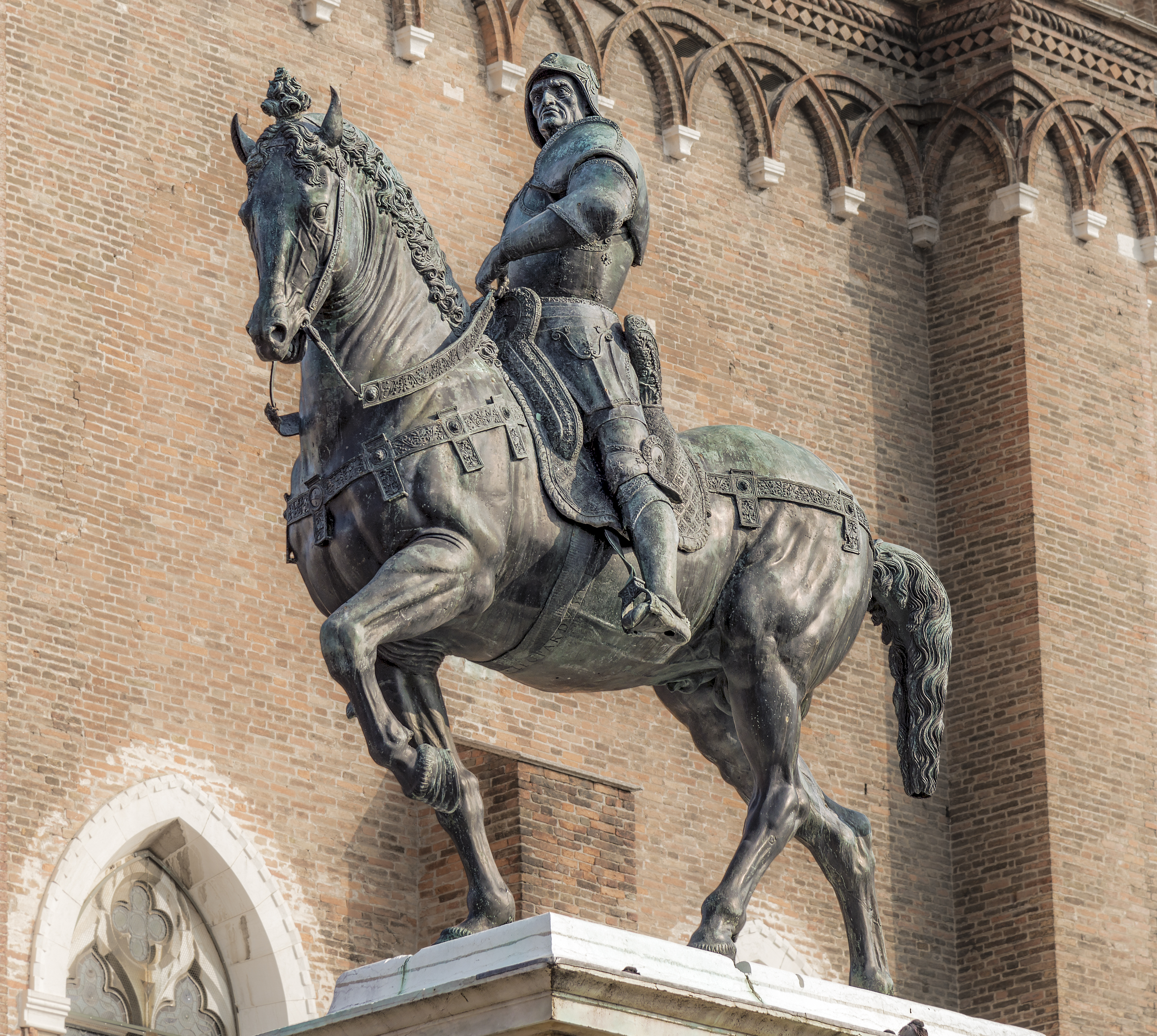
Statue of Bartolomeo Colleoni by Verrocchio, cast by Leopardi

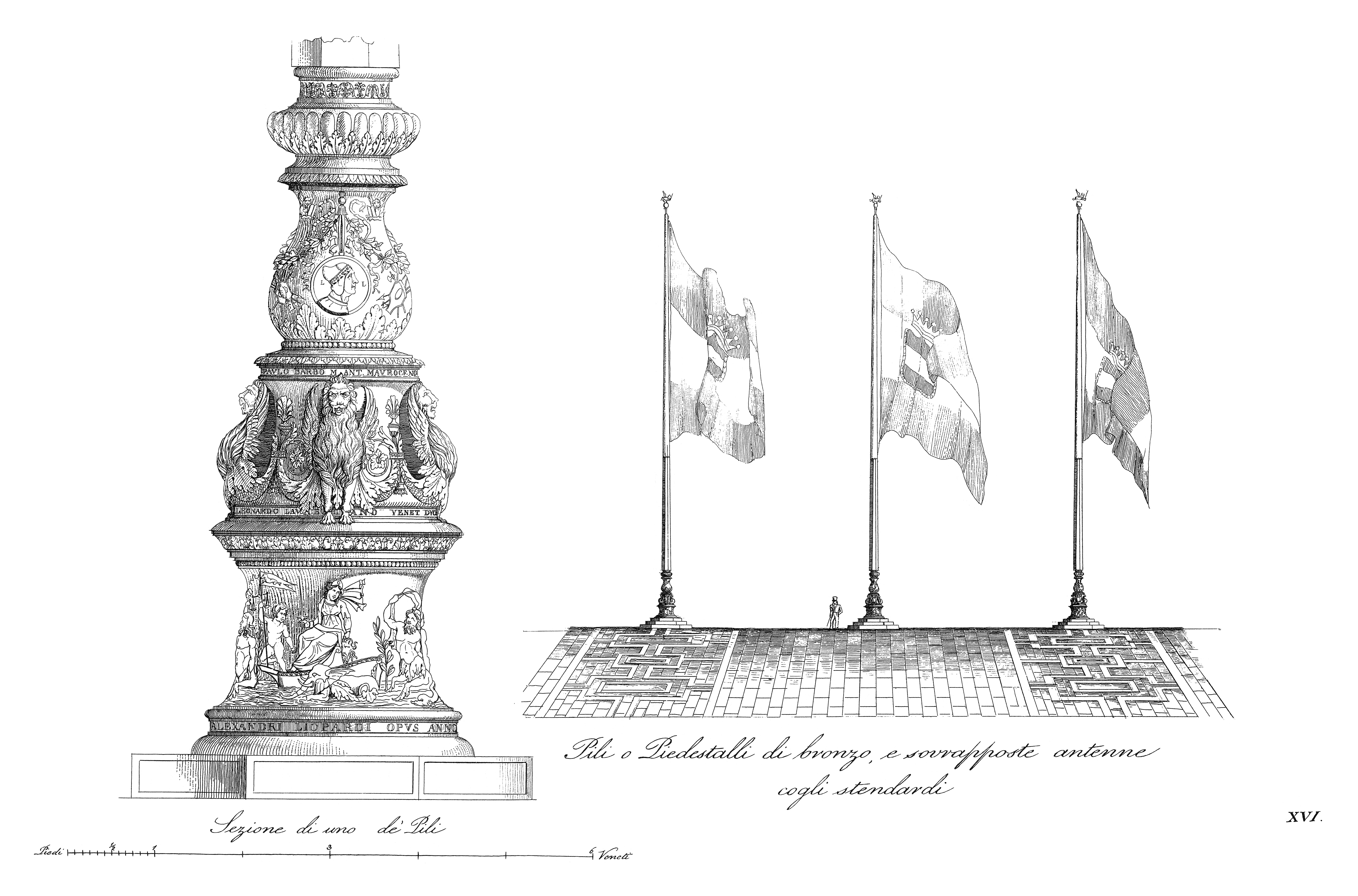
Engraving of the base of the central flagpole in Piazza San Marco

Alessandro Leopardi (sometimes called Leopardo) (1466 – 1512) was a Venetian sculptor, bronze founder and architect.

== Biography ==
Leopardi was born and died in Venice. He is first heard of in 1482 and is said to have worked at the mint. He was once reputed to have designed the sepulchral monument of doge Andrea Vendramin, now in the church of San Giovanni e Paolo, but this is generally now thought to have been the work of Tullio Lombardo, though Leopardi may have contributed some figures.

In 1479 he submitted a model for the competition initiated by the Signoria in Venice to find a sculptor for an equestrian monument to Bartolomeo Colleoni. Three sculptors submitted models including Andrea Verrocchio to whom the contract was awarded.

Leopardi was exiled for 5 years on a charge of fraud in 1487, and recalled in 1490 by the senate to finish Verrocchio's impressive statue of Bartolomeo Colleoni, which the Venetians had commissioned him to make in accordance with the provisions of Colleoni's will. Verocchio, having made the clay model in Venice, had died in 1488, before it had been cast in bronze. He asked in his will that his pupil, Lorenzo di Credi, should be engaged to arrange for it to be cast, but after much delay the Venetians in 1490 selected Leopardi to cast it and he also made the pedestal on which it stands. His name (in Latin) is inscribed on the horse's girth: "ALEXANDER . LEOPARDUS . V . P . OPUS", so that early authorities thought that the work was entirely his. The work is universally admired, though John Pope-Hennessy thought that, if Verrrochio had finished it himself, it would have been even finer.

When Colleoni bequeathed the money for his statue, he stipulated that it should be erected in the Piazza San Marco, but the Venetian state could not allow this and compromised by having it installed near the Scuola San Marco outside the church of SS Giovanni è Paolo, where it stands today.

Leopardi worked between 1503 and 1505 on the chapel of Cardinal Zeno at St. Mark's, which was finished by 1515 by Antonio Lombardo and Tullio Lombardo.

In 1505 he designed and cast the bronze bases, decorated in high relief, for the three great mast-like flagpoles in the Piazza San Marco. Each base is different and that in the centre has on a medallion a profile of the doge, Leonardo Loredan.

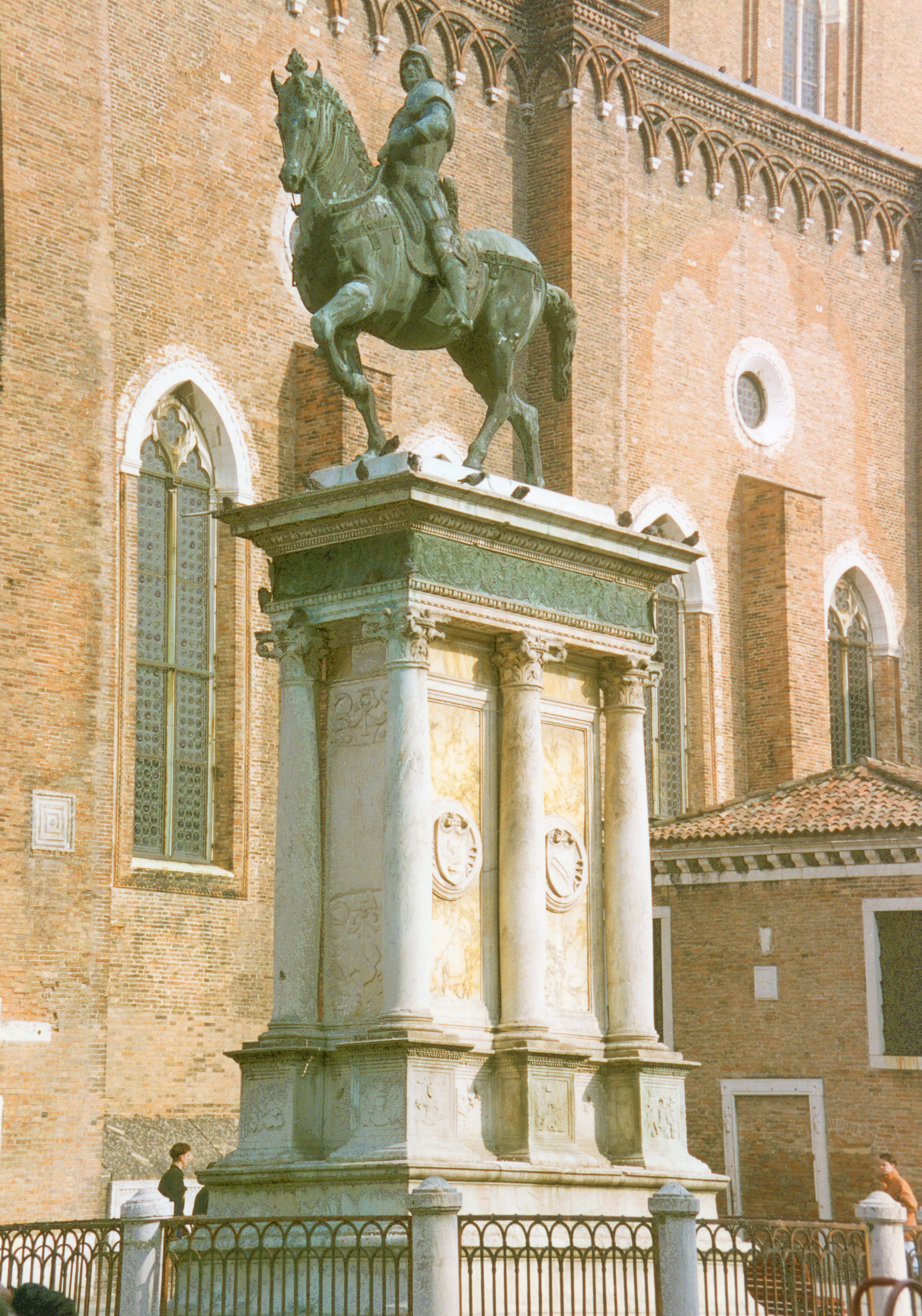
Statue of Bartolomeo Colleoni on the pedestal made for it by Leopardi

His model for the rebuilding of the Scuola Vecchia della Misericordia in Venice was provisionally accepted by the Scuola in 1507, but little progress was made with the project and in 1531, after Leopardi's death, it was superseded by Sansovino's model, although this also was never completed.

Later, he was engaged on the new church of Santa Giustina in Padua.

After the disastrous fire at the Rialto in January 1514 he was one of the four architects who submitted models for the rebuilding of the area, but the contract was given to Scarpagnino.
