= Christ and Saint Thomas (Verrocchio) =

Sculpture by Andrea del Verrocchio

Coordinates: 43°46′14.63″N 11°15′18.92″E

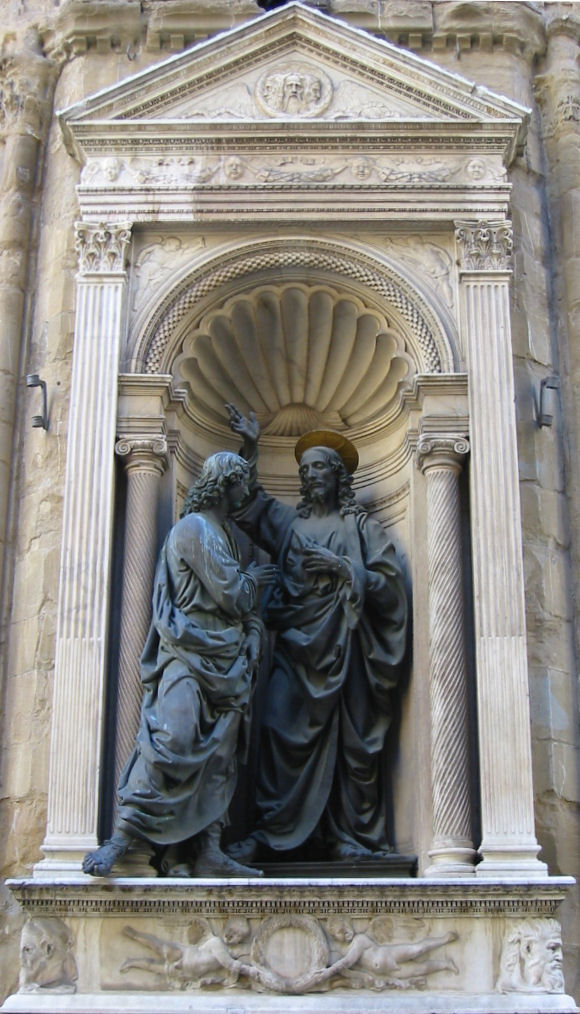
- Modern replica installed in the original niche
- Artist: Andrea del Verrocchio
- Year: 1467–1483
- Type: Bronze
- Dimensions: 230 cm (91 in)
- Location: Orsanmichele, Florence

Christ and Saint Thomas (1467–1483) is a bronze statue by Andrea del Verrocchio made for one of the fourteen niches on the exterior walls of the Orsanmichele in Florence, Italy. It is now replaced in that location by a cast and the original has been moved inside the building, which is now a museum. The sculpture shows the Incredulity of Saint Thomas, a subject frequently represented in Christian art since at least the 5th century and used to make a variety of theological points. Thomas the Apostle doubted the resurrection of Jesus and had to feel the wounds for himself in order to be convinced (John 20:24–29). The surrounding marble niche was originally designed by Donatello for his Saint Louis of Toulouse (1413), but that statue was moved to Santa Croce when the niche was sold to the Tribunale di Mercanzia (merchants' guild), who commissioned the replacement from Verrocchio.

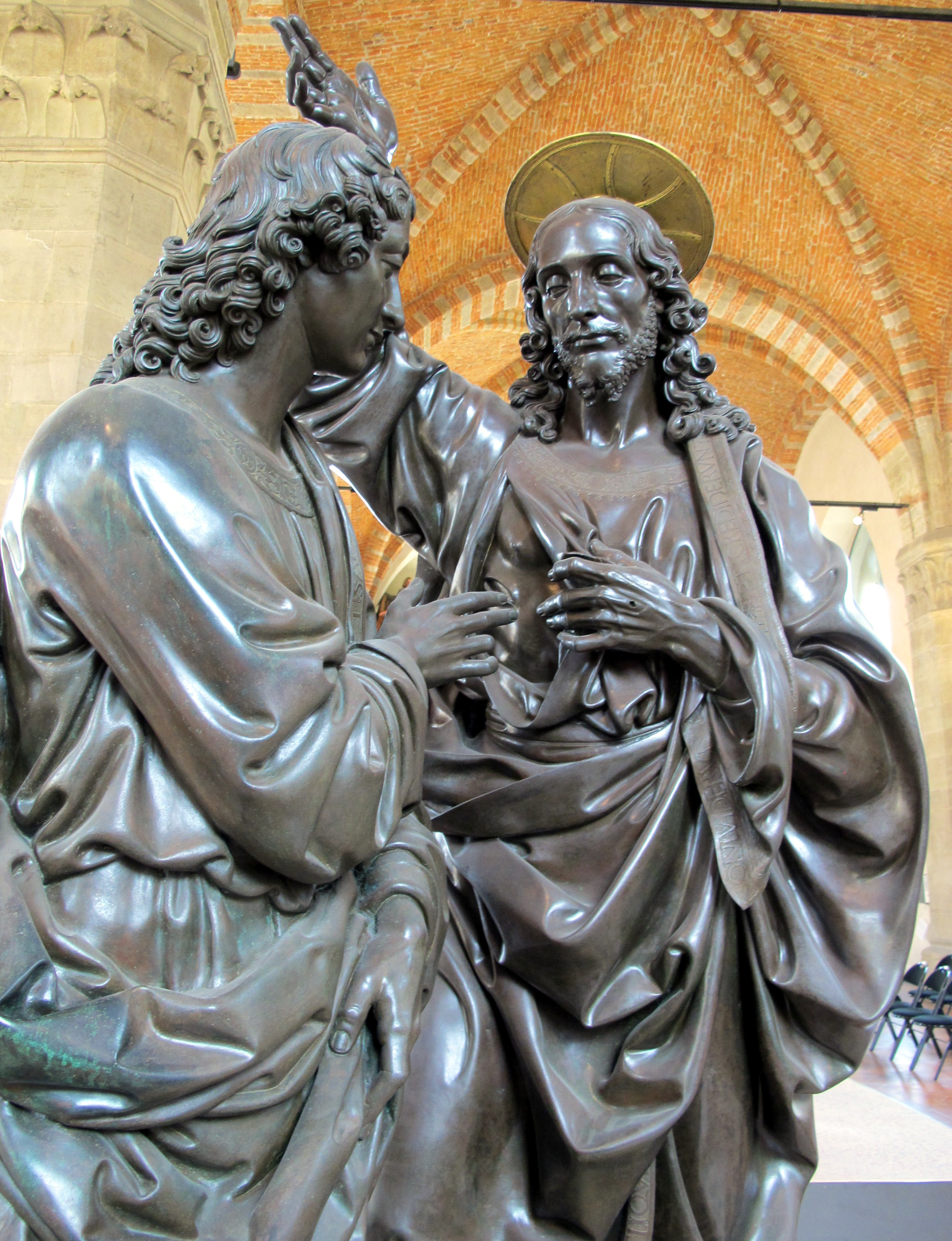
Detail of the original cast, inside Orsanmichele

The sculpture was the first narrative-based work to appear at Orsanmichele. In its execution Verrocchio showed sophisticated knowledge of the style and substance of classical sculpture. The figures were cast without backs (i.e., not in the round) as they were only to be viewed from the front. This had the added benefits of saving on bronze (which was roughly ten times more expensive than marble), and of making the work lighter and easier to fit into the niche.

The interaction between the characters of Christ and Saint Thomas show a strong sense of movement and dialogue. Differences between the mortal and the immortal are highlighted with Christ's passive, almost regal stance and the agitated and nervous disposition of the doubting Thomas.

Part of the remit of the Mercanzia was to be a judicial, overseeing body; the theme of Christ and Saint Thomas would therefore have been attractive to them as it concerned proof and the presentation of reliable evidence.

== Bibliography ==
- Hartt, Frederick and Wilkins, David G. History of Italian Renaissance Art. Upper Saddle River, NJ: Pearson Prentice Hall, 2006.
