= The Baptism of Christ (Verrocchio and Leonardo) =

Painting by Andrea del Verrocchio and Leonardo da Vinci

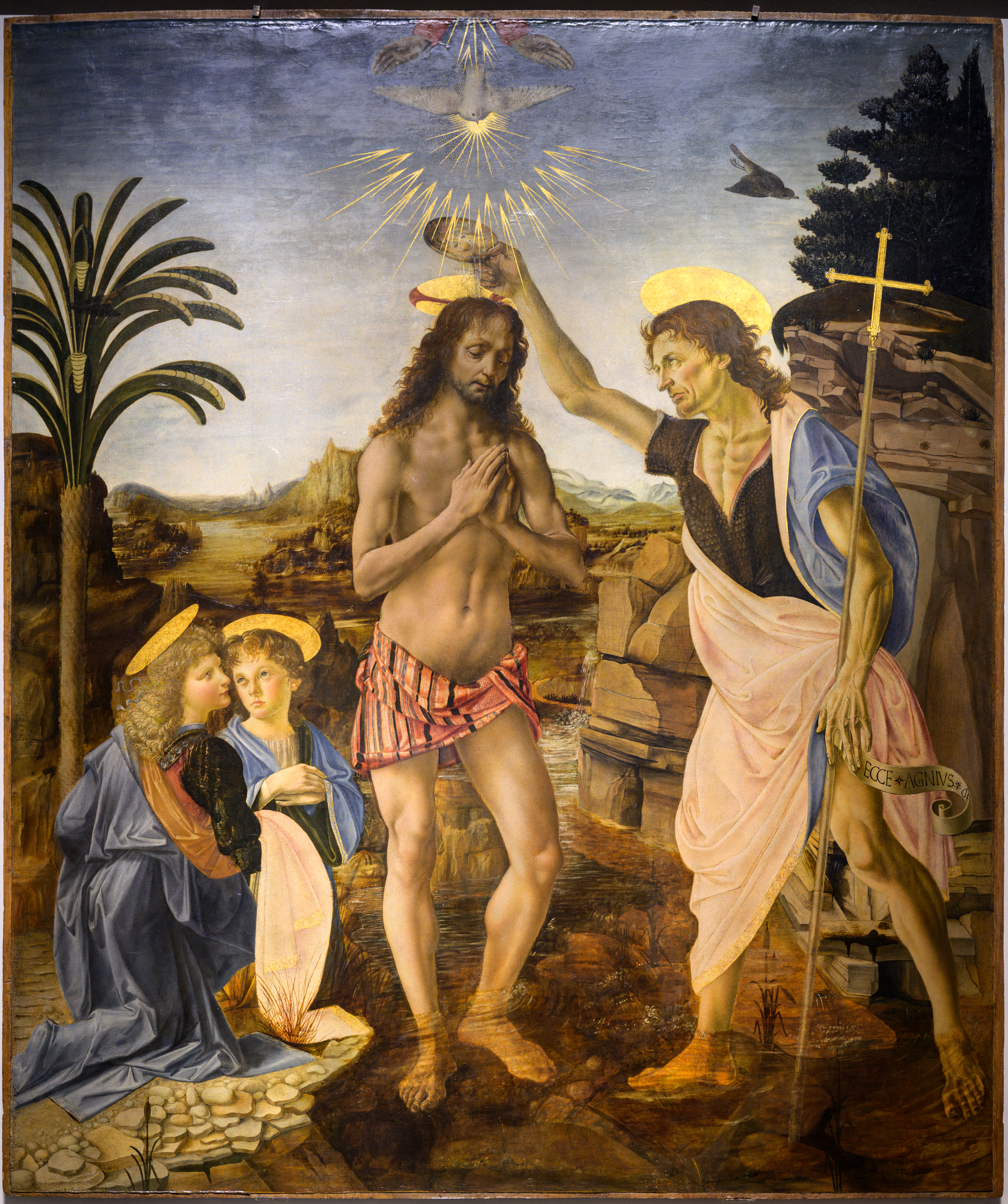
- Artist: Andrea del Verrocchio and Leonardo da Vinci
- Year: 1472–1475
- Type: Oil on wood
- Dimensions: 177 cm × 151 cm (70 in × 59 in)
- Location: Uffizi Gallery; Florence

The Baptism of Christ is an oil-on-panel painting finished around 1475 in the studio of the Italian Renaissance painter Andrea del Verrocchio and generally ascribed to him and his pupil Leonardo da Vinci. Some art historians discern the hands of other members of Verrocchio's workshop in the painting as well.

The picture depicts the Baptism of Jesus by John the Baptist as recorded in the Biblical Gospels of Matthew, Mark and Luke. The angel to the left is recorded as having been painted by the youthful Leonardo, a fact which has excited so much special comment and mythology, that the importance and value of the picture as a whole and within the œuvre of Verrocchio is often overlooked. Modern critics also attribute much of the landscape in the background to Leonardo as well. The painting is housed in the Uffizi Gallery in Florence.

== Subject matter ==
The picture depicts the Baptism of Jesus by John the Baptist on the banks of the Jordan River. There are two kneeling angels, one holding Jesus's garment, and the other with its hands folded, both in front of the symbolization of salvation and life, the palm tree. While barefoot in the river, John the Baptist is clothed in robes with a halo over his head. He is holding a staff with a gold cross at the top as he pours the river water on Jesus's head. Jesus has a halo over his head as he is depicted praying barefoot in the river. He has a small garment covering his genitals with visible pubic hair peeking through. The scroll by John's left hand contains the two Latin words "ECCE AGNIUS", a reference to a phrase in the description of Jesus' baptism in the Vulgate translation of John 1:29, Ecce agnus Dei, qui tollit peccata mundi ("Behold the Lamb of God which taketh away the sins of the world"). There is also a bright-eyed raptor that swoops down over the head of John and into the trees in the background. God's hands can be seen at the top of the painting coming from heaven as it opens up. A dove and rays of sunlight shine through which symbolize the holy spirit shining above them revealing Jesus's divine nature.

== History ==
Andrea del Verrocchio was a sculptor, goldsmith, painter and talented worker who ran a large and successful workshop in Florence in the second half of the 15th century. Verrocchio trained his apprentices by having them study surface anatomy, drawing, mechanics, sculpting, drapery studies, and the use of light and shade. He also introduced his students to subjects such as geography, Italian literature, and poetry. Verrocchio was known to set aside zones in his works for his apprentices to sketch on and eventually paint after he began them. Among his apprentices and close associates were the painters Botticelli, Francesco Botticini, Piero Perugino, Francesco di Simone, Lorenzo di Credi and Leonardo da Vinci.

Verrocchio was not himself a prolific painter and very few pictures are attributed to his hand, his fame lying chiefly in his sculptured works. Verrocchio's paintings, as are typical of Florentine works of that date, are in tempera on wooden panels. The technique of painting artworks in oil paint, previously used in Italy only for durable items like parade shields, was introduced to Florence by Dutch and Flemish painters and their imported works around the date that this painting was created.

According to Antonio Billi (1515), the painting was commissioned by Verrocchio's brother Don Simone, the head of the monastic Church of San Salvi around 1468. Verrocchio painted the general landscape along with Christ and St. John early in his career. Another contributor to the central landscape area was one of Verrocchio's assistants, Francesco Botticini. Subsequently, Verrocchio's pupil Leonardo da Vinci was asked to paint an angel in his master's composition. It is probable that Leonardo painted much of the background landscape as it is painted in oil, like the angel, while the rest of the painting is in tempera. According to Giorgio Vasari, who discussed this work in his Lives of both Verrocchio and Leonardo, Leonardo's angel and understanding of colors was so impressive that Verrocchio quit painting. Vasari did not personally know Leonardo, so the veracity of these stories is unknown, although Verrocchio's painting output seems to have ceased abruptly, with his last known painted work being the Virgin and Child with Two Angels, which he passed on to his assistant Lorenzo di Credi to complete.

William E. Wallace proposes that after Leonardo's creation of the first angel, Verrocchio added the second angel to accompany Leonardo's. Wallace concludes that Verrocchio's guidizio dell'occhio ("true eye") caught the need for this angel to be added to the right to rebalance the composition. Most Italian paintings from the 14th and 15th centuries of this religious subject include two or more angels. According to more recent technical analysis, Verrocchio began this altarpiece around 1468, which was then put aside for some years before Leonardo reworked portions of the painting's surface in the 1470s.

=== Provenance ===
The painting was at some point transferred from the Church of San Salvi to the Vallombrosan Sisterhood in Santa Verdiana. In 1810, it entered the collection of the Accademia and passed to the Uffizi in 1959.

== See also ==
- List of works by Leonardo da Vinci
