= David (Verrocchio) =

Sculpture by Andrea del Verrocchio

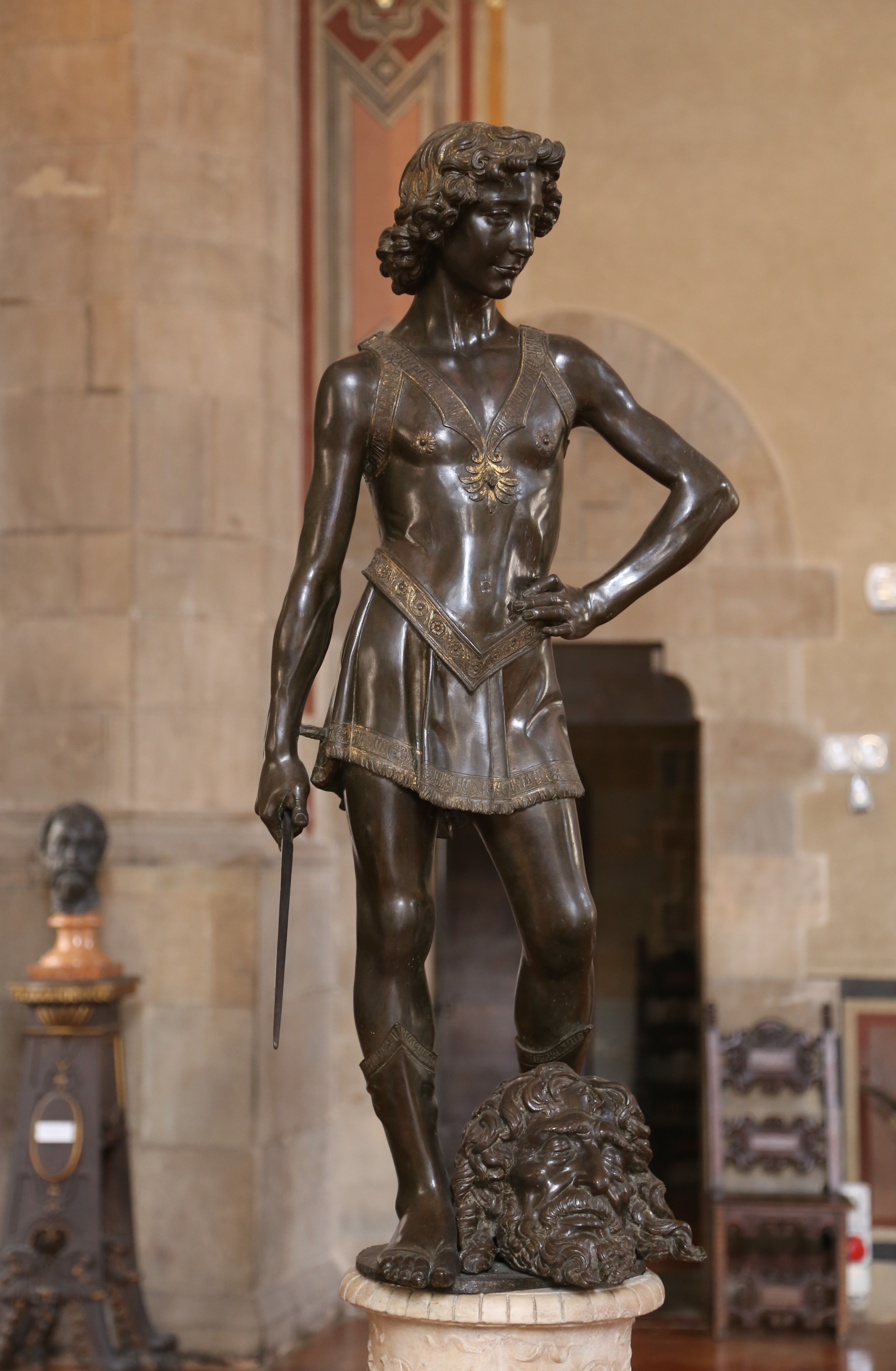
- Artist: Andrea del Verrocchio
- Year: 1473–1475
- Type: Bronze
- Dimensions: 125 cm (49 in)
- Location: Museo Nazionale del Bargello, Florence

David is a bronze statue by the Italian Renaissance artist Andrea del Verrocchio. It was most likely made between 1473 and 1475. The statue was commissioned by the Medici family. It is sometimes claimed that Verrocchio modeled the statue after his pupil Leonardo da Vinci.

The statue represents the youthful David, future king of the Israelites, triumphantly posed over the head of the slain Goliath. The bronze was initially installed in Palazzo Vecchio in 1476. The ornament on David's leather tunic includes pseudo-Kufic letters imitating Arabic script.

The placement of Goliath's head has been a source of some debate for art historians. When exhibited at the National Gallery of Art in Washington, the head was placed between David's feet, as is the case in the statue's permanent home, the National Museum of the Bargello, in Florence, Italy. Another school of art historians have suggested that Verrocchio intended for Goliath's head to be placed to David's right, pointing to the diagonals of the ensemble. This placement was temporarily arranged at the National Gallery of Art, as well as Atlanta's High Museum of Art, among others.

David was intended as a symbolic representation of Florence, as both were more powerful than they appeared, and both the shepherd boy and Florence could be viewed as rising powers.

The Victoria and Albert Museum in London also owns a plaster cast of Verrocchio's David.
