= Ginevra de' Benci (aristocrat) =

Florentine aristocrat (1457–1521)

Ginevra de' Benci by Leonardo da Vinci, c. 1474-1478

Ginevra de' Benci (1457–1521) was a member of the Benci family in Florence and is the subject of an early portrait by Leonardo da Vinci.

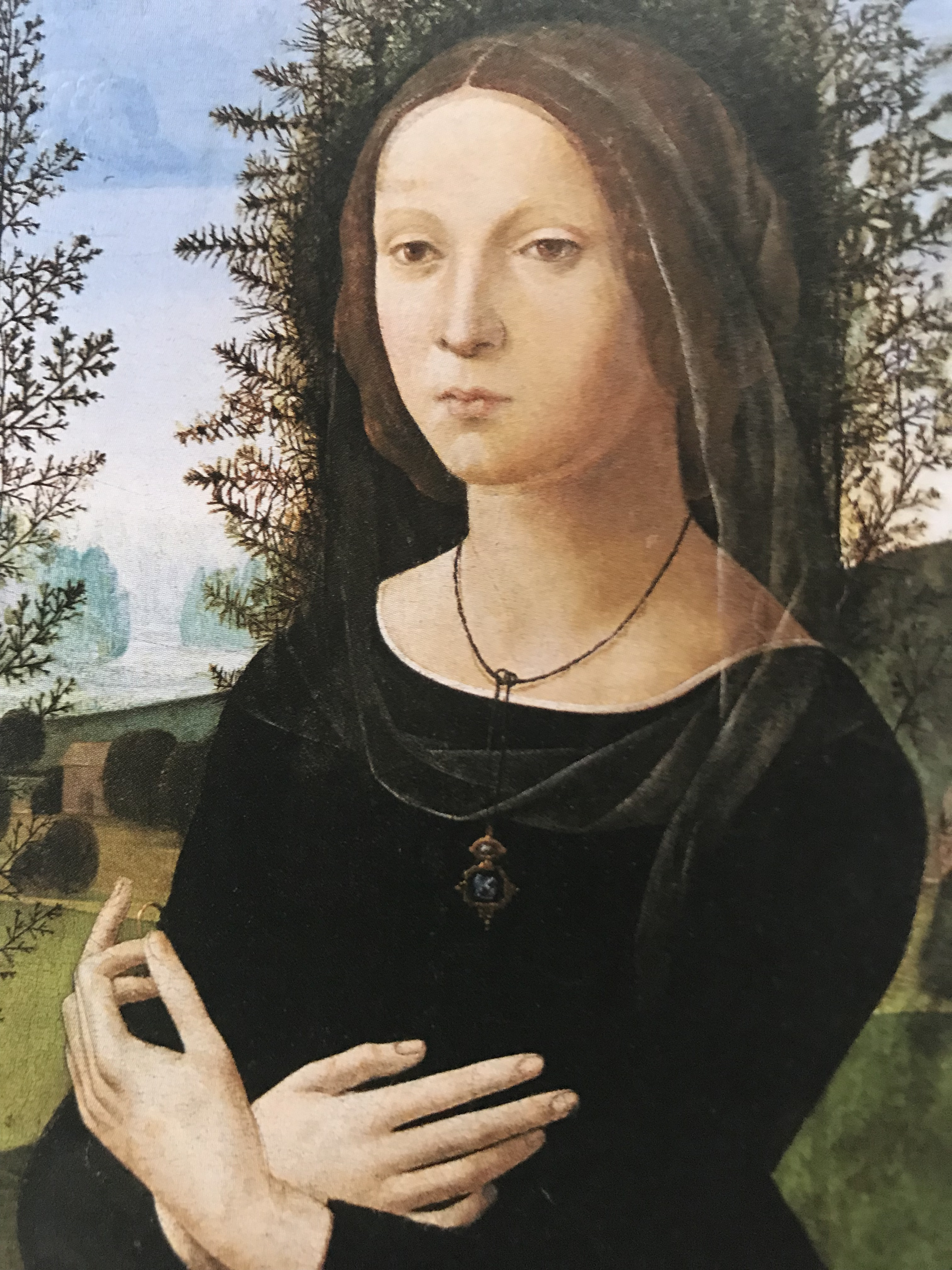
Possible portrait of Ginevra de' Benci by Lorenzo di Credi

Ginevra was born into a family of wealthy Florentine merchants in 1457. The Benci had business dealings with the Medici and were noted humanists themselves, patronizing artists and writers and creating an important library of classical texts. In 1474 she married Luigi de Bernardo Niccolini. Bernardo Bembo, Lorenzo de' Medici, Alessandro Braccesi, and Christoforo Landino dedicated poems to her.

Ginevra shed tears as you go, Bembo.
May she desire long delays and
Beseech the Gods above that
Every difficulty may hinder your journey.
And may she wish that the kindly stars
With adverse winds and heavy storms
Prevent your departure
—Alessandro Bracessi

Ginevra was widely admired for her beauty, intellect, and poetry. Only a single line of her poetry survives: "I ask your forgiveness and I am a mountain tiger."

She spent her later life in self imposed exile, trying to recover from illness and an ill-fated love affair. She died in 1521 aged 63 or 64, likely from this unknown illness.
