= Lorenzo di Credi =

Italian painter (1456/59–1537)

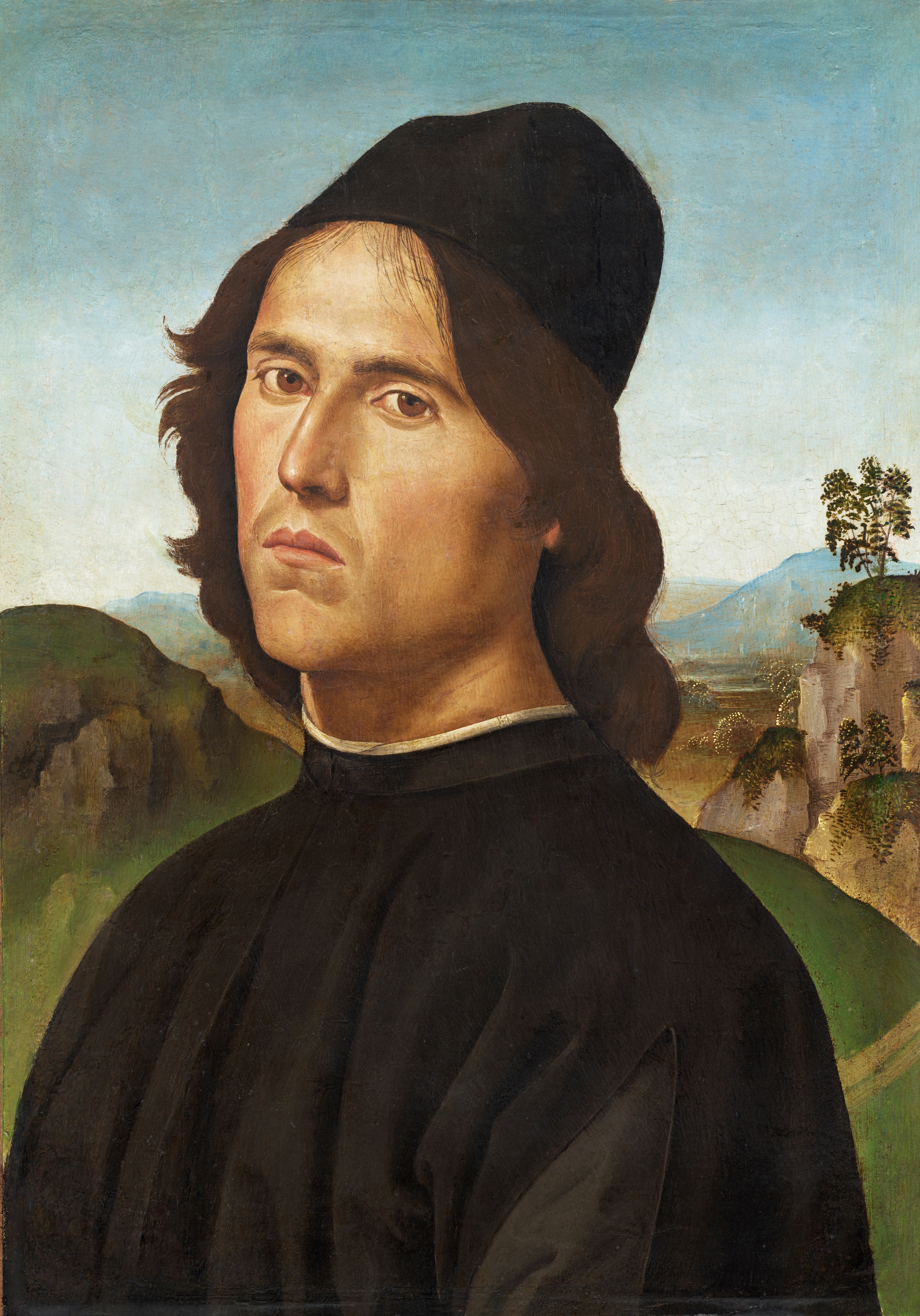
Perugino, Portrait of Lorenzo di Credi, 1488. Oil on panel, 18 x 12 in. Washington, D.C., National Gallery of Art.

Lorenzo di Credi (1456/59 – January 12, 1537) was an Italian Renaissance painter and sculptor best known for his paintings of religious subjects, and portraits. With some excursions to nearby cities, his whole life was spent in Florence. He is most famous for having worked in the studio of Andrea del Verrocchio at the same time as the young Leonardo da Vinci, who seems to have influenced his style considerably.

He trained with Verrocchio, and became his principal assistant, inheriting the workshop after his master's death in 1488, when Lorenzo was still in his twenties. He largely continued his master's style, working until at least the 1520s, by which time he was becoming rather old-fashioned. He does not seem to have painted frescos himself, although his workshop may have done so. Vasari says that he avoided large paintings of all sorts, preferring to create smaller works with a meticulous finish.

== Life ==
Lorenzo was born in Florence in 1456 or 1459 to a goldsmith named Andrea d' Oderigo. He was apprenticed to the leading master Andrea del Verrocchio, where he is first recorded, on low wages, in 1480/81. He eventually became Verrocchio's primary assistant, running the shop during the master's absence in 1482-1483, and inherited his workshop on Verrocchio's death in 1488. On Verrocchio's behalf he completed the famous Madonna di Piazza for Pistoia Cathedral, commissioned from Verrocchio in 1475 but executed by Lorenzo between 1485 and 1491.

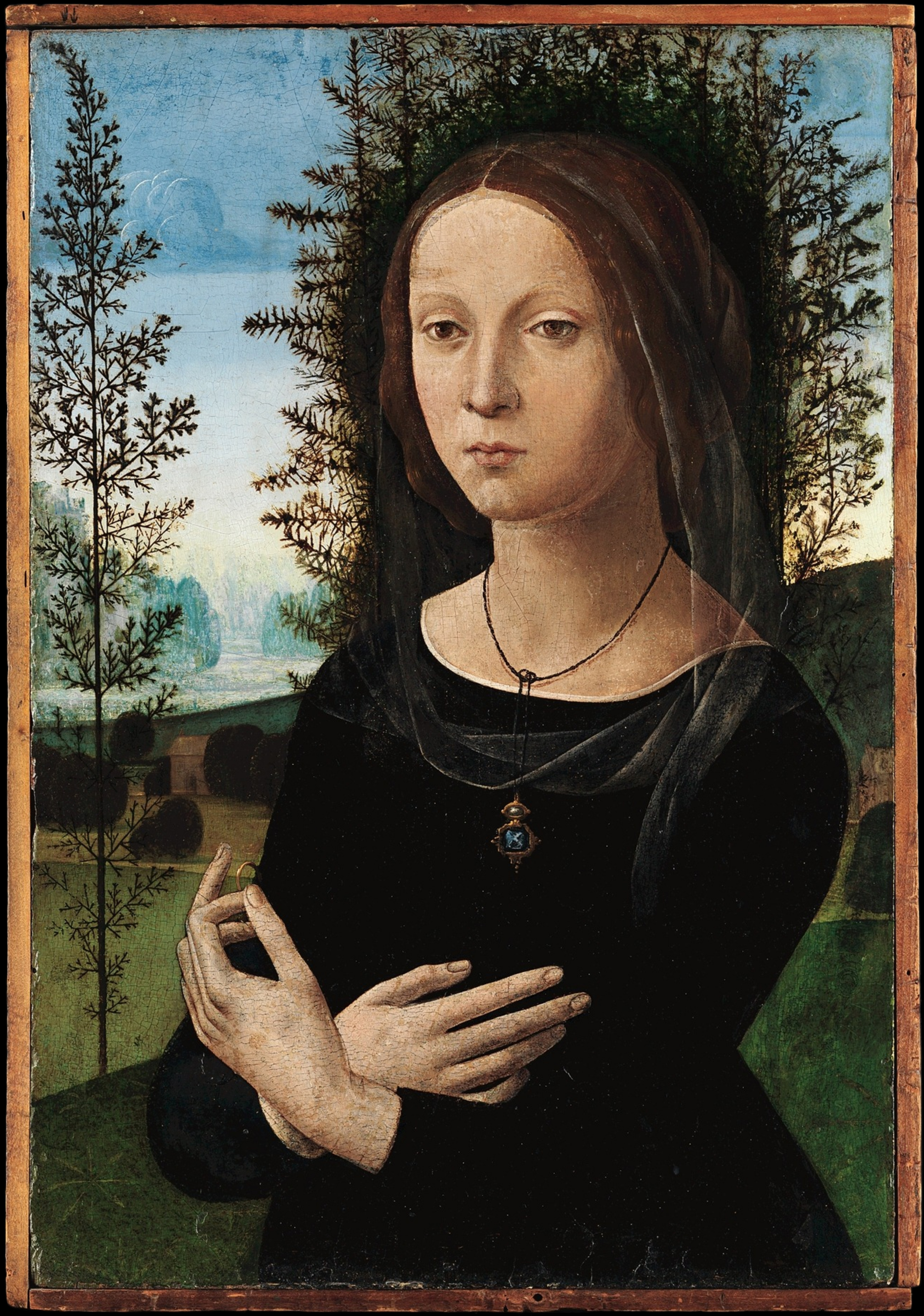
Portrait of a Young Woman, ca 1490. New York, Metropolitan Museum of Art

Lorenzo's earliest independent works include an Annunciation in the Uffizi, two panels of the Madonna and Child at the Galleria Sabauda in Turin, another at the National Gallery in London and Adoration of the Child at the Pinacoteca Querini Stampalia in Venice. From his maturity date the Madonna and Child with Saints Julian and Nicholas (1493) for the Mascalonzi chapel at the Cestello, Florence (Paris, Louvre), the Adoration of the Shepherds (1487) for Santa Chiara (now at the Uffizi) and the Baptism of Christ for the altar of the oratory of the Confraternity of San Giovanni Battista detto dello Scalzo (famous for its Chiostro dello Scalzo where Andrea del Sarto painted his St John the Baptist fresco cycle) (Lorenzo di Credi's panel is now found in Fiesole, San Domenico). In 1501 he remade parts of Fra Angelico's high altarpiece for San Domenico, Fiesole. Later works include an altarpiece (1510–12) for the Ospedale del Ceppo, Pistoia (now in that town's Museo Civico) and many small religious panels, including an unfinished Crucifixion at Göttingen University and an Annunciation dated 1508 at the Harvard University Art Museums.

Lorenzo was also a painter of portraits. His most famous is the Portrait of Caterina Sforza, called La dama dei gelsomini, at the Pinacoteca in Forlí. Caterina Sforza was the Lady of Forlì and Imola in the Romagna and later a prisoner of Cesare Borgia. Lorenzo's portrait of her has been the subject of recent attention because of the sitter's resemblance to the Mona Lisa by Leonardo da Vinci. Another portrait by Lorenzo, perhaps of his brother's widow is the panel now at the Metropolitan Museum of Art. The composition of this work is often compared to Leonardo's Ginevra de' Benci at the National Gallery of Art, Washington, D.C.

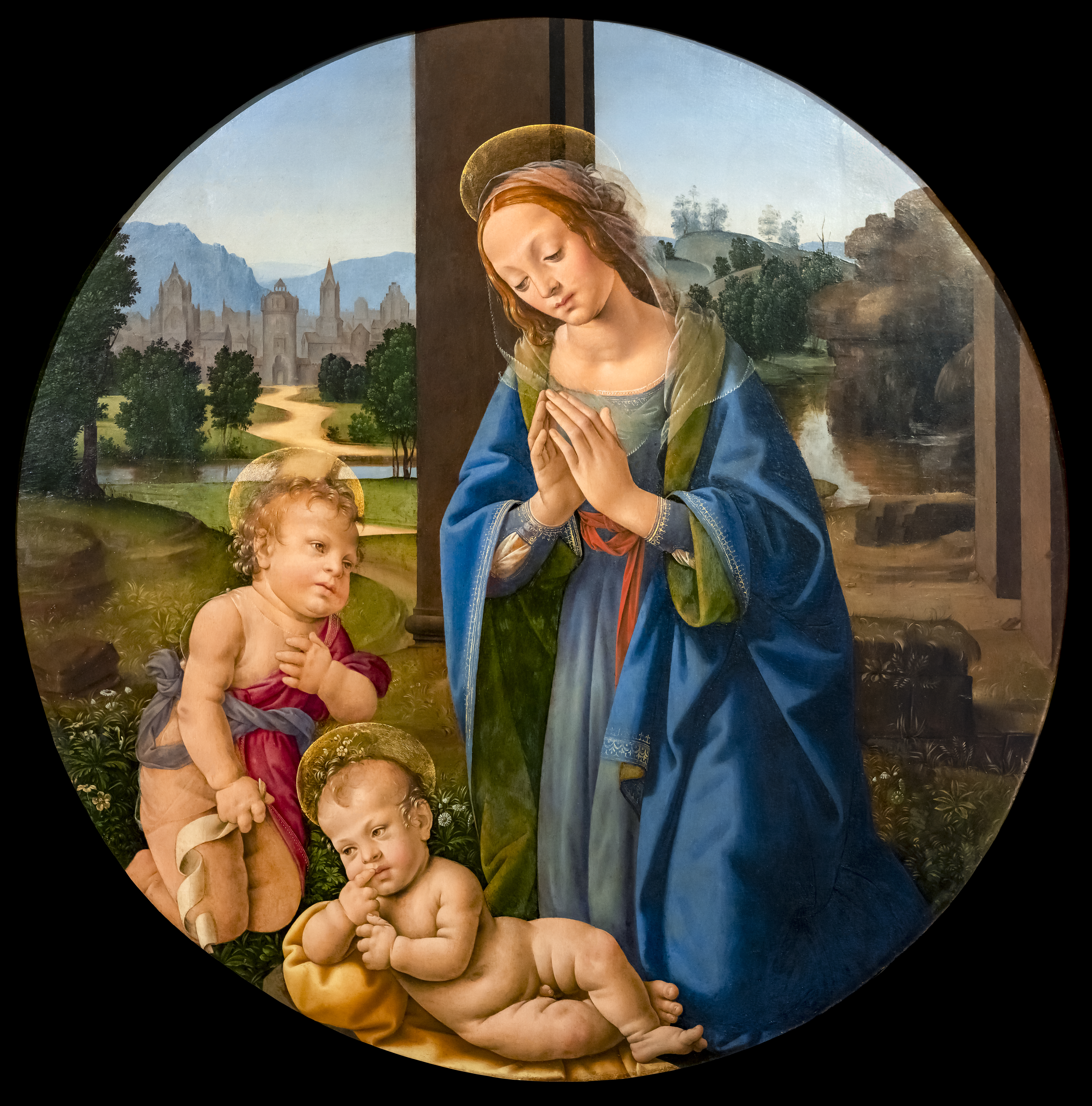
Madonna adoring the Child with the Infant Saint John the Baptist, c. 1485. Venice, Pinacoteca Querini Stampalia

Several of his patrons had links to Savonarola, and apart from portraits, secular subjects such as mythological ones are absent from his known works, except for a nearly nude Venus for the Medici family. In 1504 he was appointed to the committee set up to decide where to place Michelangelo's David.

Giorgio Vasari devoted a biography to Lorenzo di Credi in his Lives of the Artists. Though Vasari praised Lorenzo's art for its high finish, he criticized him for being a perfectionist who was excessively diligent, ground his pigments too fine, and spent too much time distilling his oils.

Lorenzo had many pupils. His most important were Giovanni Antonio Sogliani, who assisted Lorenzo in many of his late works. Others include Tommaso di Stefano Lunetti and Antonio del Ceraiolo. Collaborators and followers included Giovanni di Benedetto Cianfanini, the Master of the Johnson Ascension of the Magdalene (named after a painting now in Philadelphia) and the anonymous artist known as "Tommaso" (also called Tommaso di Credi, the Master of the Czartoryski Tondo or the Master of the Santo Spirito Conversazione).

Lorenzo died in Florence in 1537.

== Sculptor? ==
Lorenzo is usually described as a sculptor and, given his father's profession and the important part sculpture played in Verrocchio's workshop, he no doubt received training in it. But he seems to have worked largely or entirely in paint, though drawings are also attributed to him. The workshop probably continued to offer sculpture.

At the time of Verrocchio's death in 1488, his workshop was in the middle of the very large commission for the Equestrian statue of Bartolomeo Colleoni for Venice. Verrocchio's will recommended Lorenzo to the Venetian authorities to finish the job; at that point the statue seems only to have existed in clay, and casting had not begun. Lorenzo transferred his rights, such as they were, to another artist, apparently a "bronze technician". It was eventually finished by the Venetian bronze sculptor Alessandro Leopardi several years later.

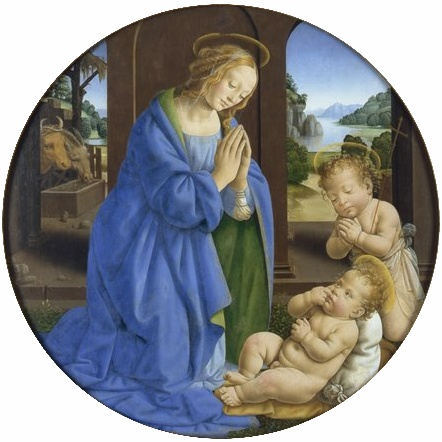
Madonna adoring the Child with the Infant Saint John the Baptist, circa 1485. Karlsruhe, Kunsthalle

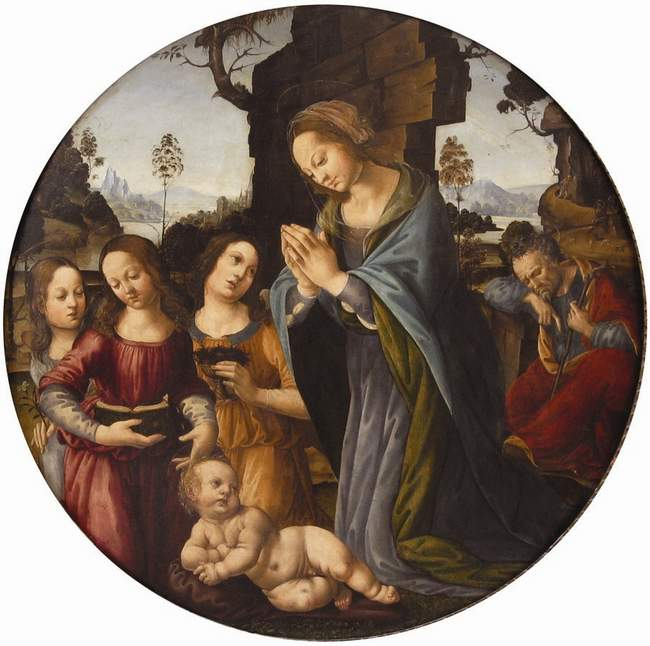
Adoration, c 1487. National Museum of Serbia, Belgrade

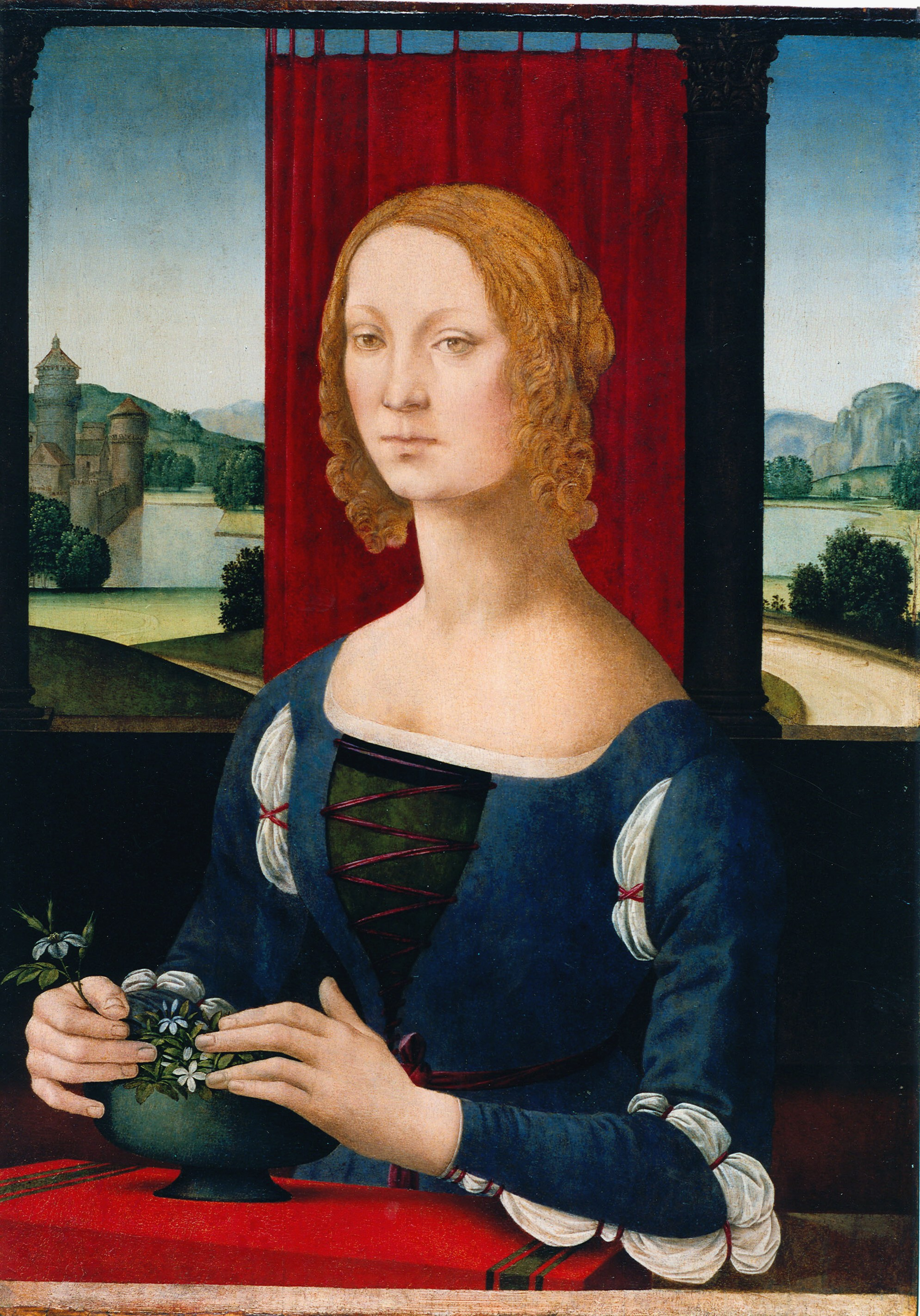
Portrait of Caterina Sforza, circa 1490. Forlì, Pinacoteca

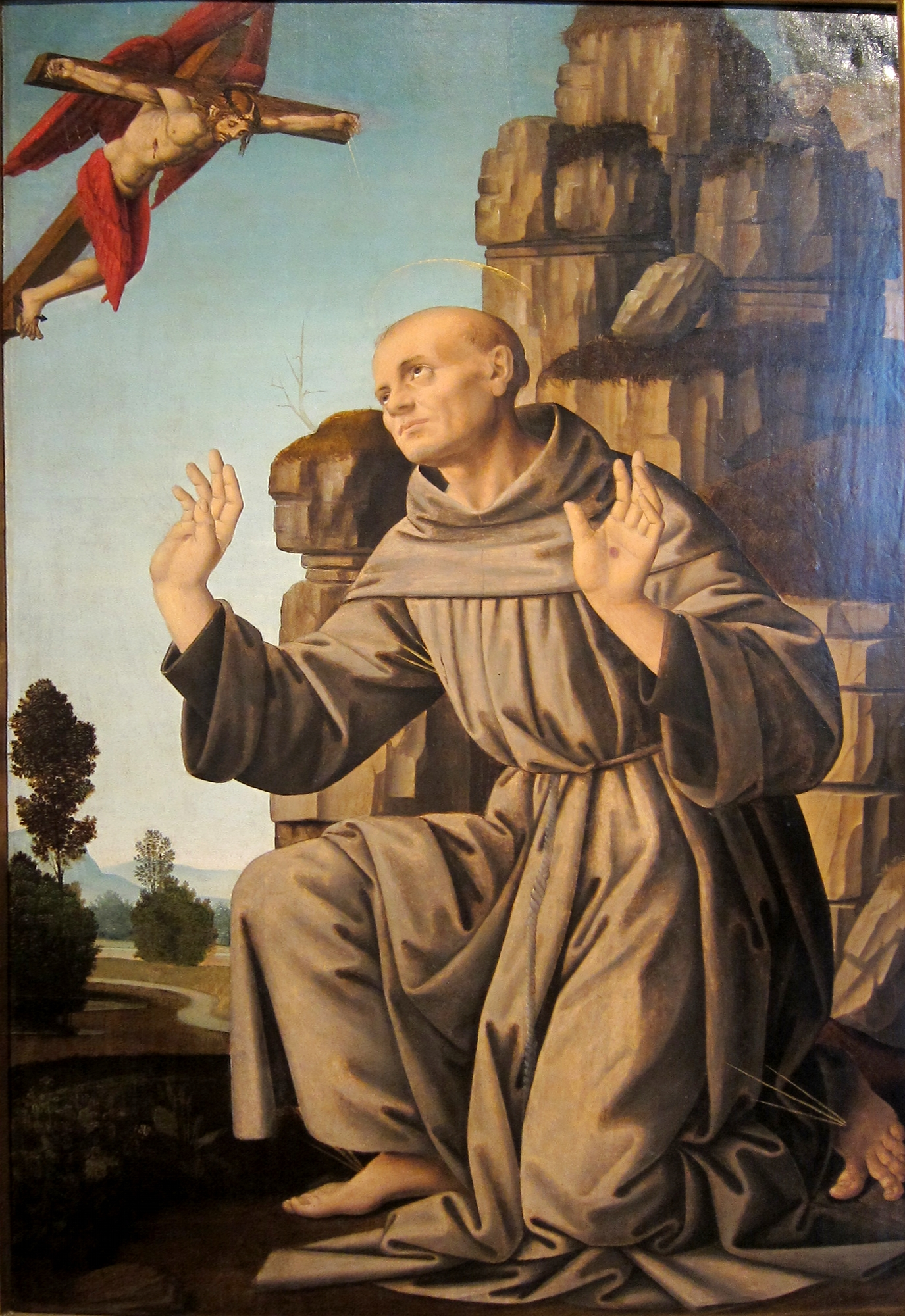
Stigmatization of Saint Francis, circa 1490. Ajaccio, Musée Fesch

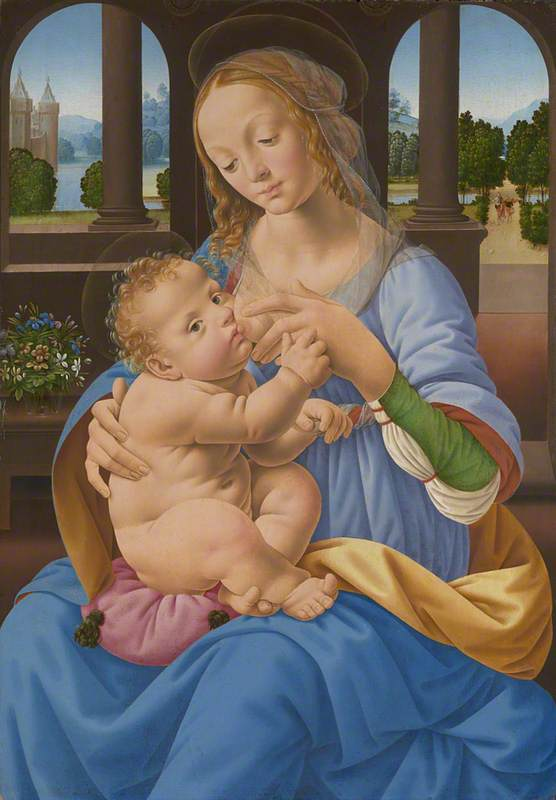
Virgin and Child (Virgo Lactans), before 1500, National Gallery. Tobias and the Angel walk through the garden at top right.

== Sources ==
- Dalli Regoli, Gigetta. Lorenzo di Credi. Milan: Edizioni di Communità, 1966
- Davies, Martin, The Earlier Italian Schools, National Gallery Catalogues, 1961, reprinted 1986, ISBN 0901791296
- Grossman, Sheldon. “Two New Paintings by Lorenzo di Credi: A Contribution to the Painter’s Late Style,” Mitteilungen des Kunsthistorischen Institutes in Florenz, 14, Bd., H. 2 (December 1969): pp. 161–182.
- Kent, Francis W. “Lorenzo di Credi, His Patron Iacopo Bongianni and Savonarola,” The Burlington Magazine, vol. 125, no. 966 (September 1983): pp. 538–541.
- "NGA": NGA biography
- Seymour, Charles Jr., Sculpture in Italy, 1400-1500, Penguin (Pelican History of Art), 1966
