= Ginevra de' Benci =

Painting by Leonardo da Vinci

- Artist: Leonardo da Vinci
- Year: c. 1474–1478
- Type: Oil on panel
- Dimensions: 38.1 cm × 37 cm (15.0 in × 15 in)
- Location: National Gallery of Art, Washington, D.C.
- Accession: 1967.6.1.a

Ginevra de' Benci is a portrait painting by Leonardo da Vinci of the 15th-century Florentine aristocrat Ginevra de' Benci (born c. 1458). It was acquired by the National Gallery of Art in Washington, D.C. US from Franz Joseph II, Prince of Liechtenstein in February 1967 for a record price for a painting of between $5 and $6 million. It is the only painting by Leonardo on public view in the Americas.

== Subject ==
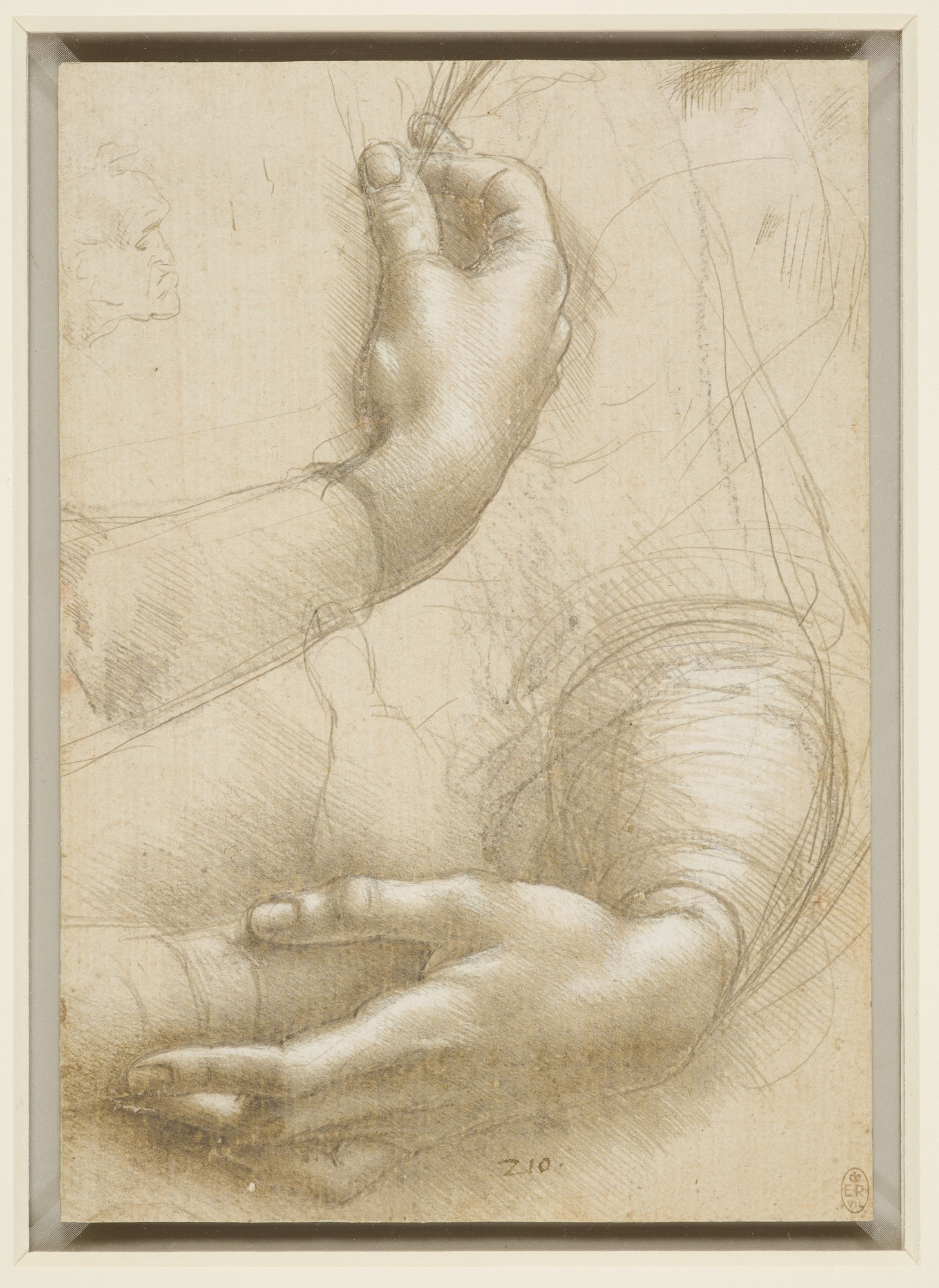
Leonardo da Vinci, Study of a Woman's Hands, 1490

Reverse of the portrait

Ginevra de' Benci, a well-known young Florentine woman, is universally considered to be the portrait's sitter. Leonardo painted the portrait in Florence between 1474 and 1478, possibly to commemorate Ginevra's marriage to Luigi di Bernardo Niccolini at the age of 16. More likely, it commemorates the engagement. Commonly, contemporary portraits of women were commissioned for either of two occasions: betrothal or marriage. Wedding portraits traditionally were created in pairs, with the woman on the right, facing left; since this portrait faces right, it more likely represents betrothal.

The juniper bush that surrounds Ginevra's head and fills much of the background, serves more than mere decorative purposes. In Renaissance Italy, the juniper was regarded a symbol of female virtue, while the Italian word for juniper, ginepro, also makes a play on Ginevra's name.

The imagery and text on the reverse of the panel—a juniper sprig encircled by a wreath of laurel and palm, memorialized by the Latin motto Virtvtem Forma Decorat ("Beauty adorns virtue")—further support the identification of the portrait. The phrase is understood as symbolizing the intricate relationship between Ginevra's intellectual and moral virtue on the one hand, and her physical beauty on the other. The sprig of juniper, encircled by laurel and palm, suggests her name. The laurel and palm are in the personal emblem of Bernardo Bembo, a Venetian ambassador to Florence whose platonic relationship with Ginevra is revealed in poems exchanged between them. Infrared examination has revealed Bembo's motto "Virtue and Honor" beneath Ginevra's [????], making it likely that Bembo was somehow involved in the commission of the portrait.

The portrait is one of the highlights of the National Gallery of Art, and is admired by many for its portrayal of Ginevra's temperament. Ginevra is beautiful, but austere; she has no hint of a smile and her gaze, although forward, seems indifferent to the viewer.

At some point, the bottom of the painting was removed, presumably owing to damage, and Ginevra's arms and hands are thought to have been lost. Using the golden ratio, Susan Dorothea White has drawn an interpretation of how her arms and hands may have been positioned in the original. The adaptation is based on drawings of hands by Leonardo thought to be studies for this painting.

== Trivia ==
- As a woman of renowned beauty, Ginevra de' Benci was also the subject of ten poems written by members of the Medici circle, Cristoforo Landino and Alessandro Braccesi, and of two sonnets by Lorenzo de' Medici himself.
- According to Giorgio Vasari, Ginevra de' Benci was also included in the fresco by Domenico Ghirlandaio of the Visitation of Mary and Elizabeth in the church of Santa Maria Novella in Florence, but it is believed that Vasari was mistaken and that Ghirlandaio painted Giovanna Tornabuoni.
- Ginevra's brother Giovanni (1456–1523) was a friend of Leonardo. When Vasari wrote his Lives, Leonardo's unfinished Adoration of the Magi was in the house of Amerigo Benci, Giovanni's son.
- In 2017, the researcher and cryptographer Carla Glori anagrammatized fifty Latin sentences signed VINCI, formed with the very same alphabetical letters of the motto VIRTVTEM FORMA DECORAT when supplemented with the Latin word iuniperus (juniper [sprig]). Glori argues that the anagrams form a coherent text and have a meaning that unequivocally refers to the portrait and to the biography of Ginevra Benci.

== See also ==
- List of works by Leonardo da Vinci
- Pietro Bembo, son of Bernardo Bembo
