= Andrea del Verrocchio =

15th-century Italian sculptor, goldsmith and painter

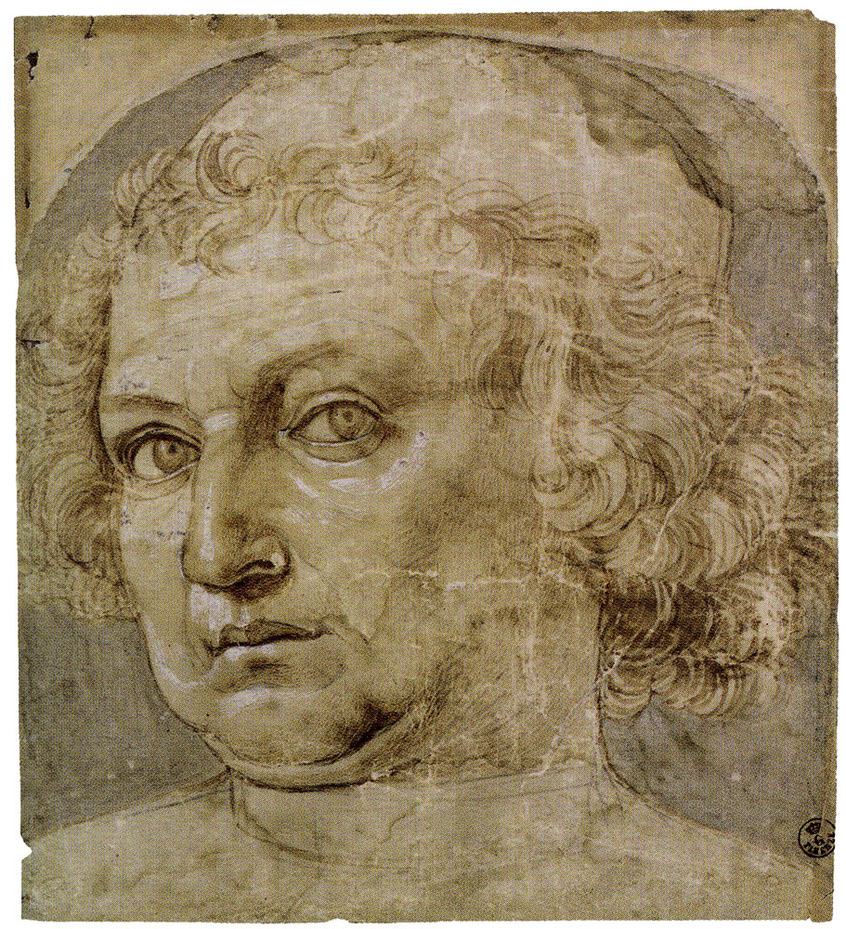
- Portrait of Verrocchio by Andrea del Castagno, c. 1470
- Born: Andrea di Michele di Francesco de' Cioni c. 1435; Florence, Republic of Florence
- Died: 1488 (aged 52–53); Venice, Republic of Venice
- Notable work: paintings: Tobias and the Angel; The Baptism of Christ (with Leonardo da Vinci) bronze sculptures: Christ and St. Thomas; Putto with a Dolphin; David; Equestrian Statue of Bartolomeo Colleoni stone sculpture: Dama col mazzolino
- Movement: Italian Renaissance

Andrea del Verrocchio (/vəˈroʊkioʊ/ və-ROH-kee-oh, US also /-ˈrɔːk-/ -RAW-, Italian: [anˈdrɛːa del verˈrɔkkjo]; born Andrea di Michele di Francesco de' Cioni; c. 1435 – 1488) was an Italian sculptor, painter and goldsmith who was a master of a workshop in Florence. He was the teacher of Leonardo da Vinci, who assisted in painting The Baptism of Christ.

He became known as Verrocchio after the surname of his master, a goldsmith. Few paintings are attributed to him with certainty, but his pupils also included Pietro Perugino and Lorenzo di Credi. As a sculptor, his best known work is the Equestrian statue of Bartolomeo Colleoni in Venice.

== Life ==
Verrocchio was born in Florence in around 1435. His father, Michele di Francesco Cioni, initially worked as a tile and brick maker, then later as a tax collector. Verrocchio never married, and had to provide financial support for some members of his family. He was at first apprenticed to a goldsmith. It has been suggested that he was later apprenticed to Donatello, but there is no evidence of this and John Pope-Hennessy considered that it is contradicted by the style of his early works. It has been suggested that he was trained as a painter under Fra Filippo Lippi.

Little is known about his life. His main works are dated in his last twenty years and his advancement owed much to the patronage of Lorenzo de' Medici and his son Piero. His workshop was in Florence where he was a member of the Guild of St Luke. Several great artists like Leonardo da Vinci and Lorenzo di Credi passed through his workshop as apprentices. Beyond this, artists like Domenico Ghirlandaio, Francesco Botticini, and Pietro Perugino were also involved and their early works can be hard to distinguish from works by Verrocchio. Giovanni Santi records that Botticelli, Luca Signorelli, and a young Filippino Lippi also visited or worked in Verrocchio's studio. Of the artist's pedagogy the Florentine poet Ugolino Verino wrote: "Whatever painters have that is good they drank from Verrocchio's spring".

At the end of his life, Verrocchio opened a new workshop in Venice, where he was working on the statue of Bartolomeo Colleoni, leaving the Florentine workshop in charge of Lorenzo di Credi. He died in Venice in 1488.

== Painting ==
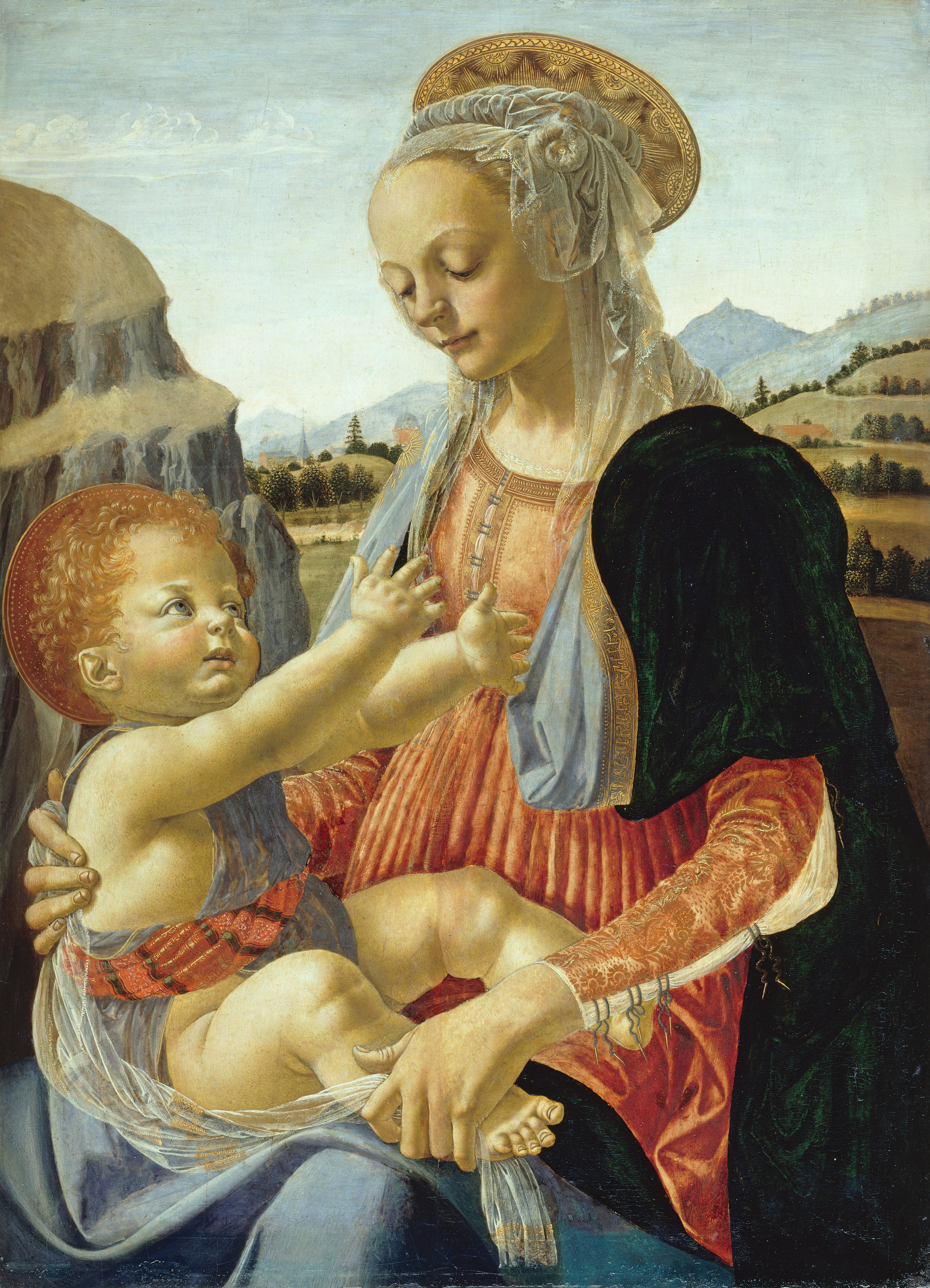
Madonna with Seated Child, 1468–1470, Gemäldegalerie, Berlin

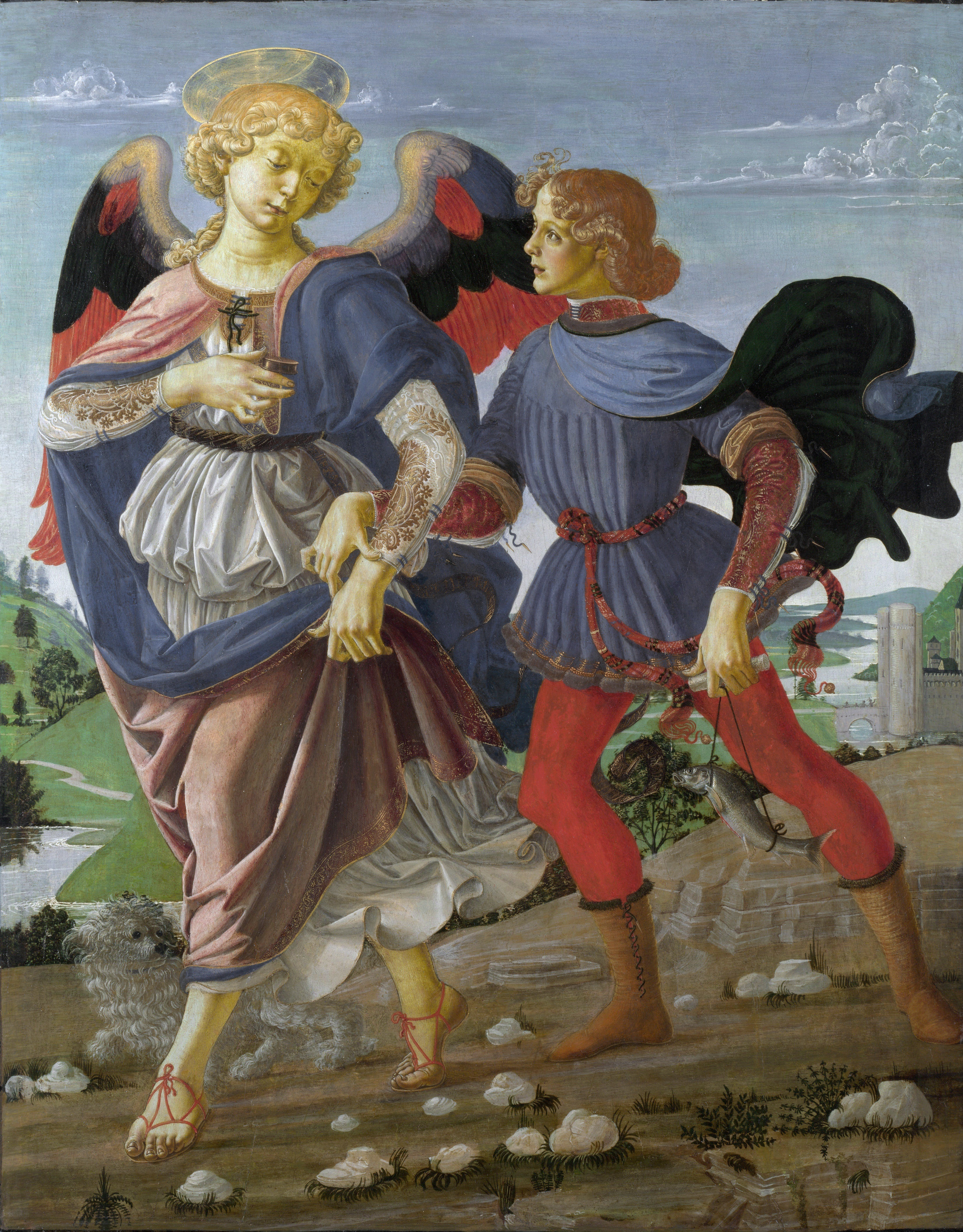
Tobias and the Angel, 1470–1475, National Gallery, London

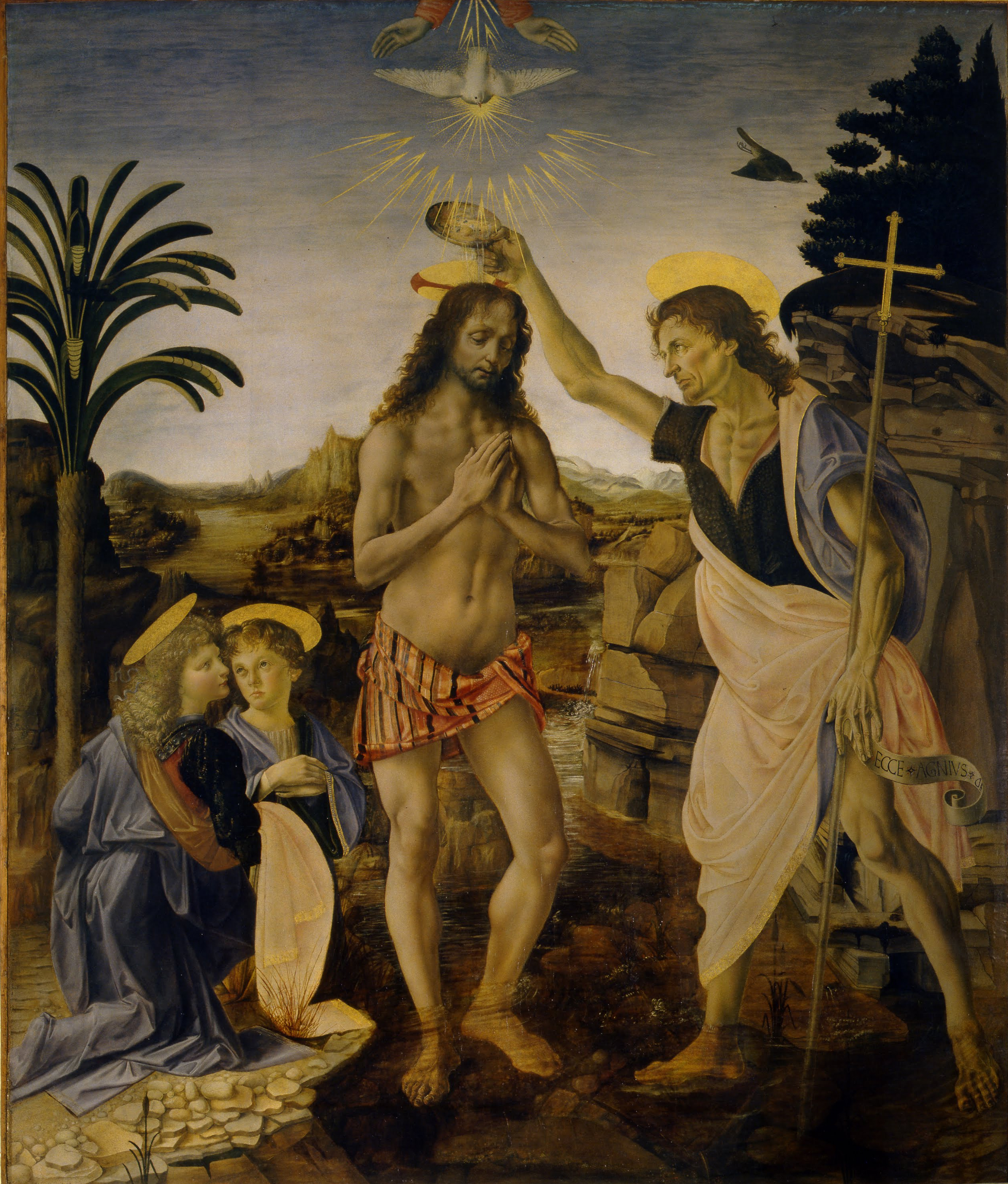
Baptism of Christ, 1474–1475, Uffizi, Florence

Despite the importance of Verrocchio's workshop in the training of younger painters, very few paintings are universally recognised as his own work and there are many problems of attribution.

A painting of the Madonna with Seated Child in tempera on panel (now in the Gemäldegalerie of Berlin State Museums) is considered an early work of 1468–1470.

A painting in the National Gallery in London (cat. no.NG2508) of the Virgin and Child with Two Angels in tempera on panel, which had not previously been attributed to Verrocchio, was cleaned and restored about 2010 and is now attributed to him with a date of about 1467–1469.

A small painting on panel of Tobias setting out on his journey with the Archangel Raphael, carrying the fish with which he was to heal his father's blindness, was probably painted as a private devotional picture. It is an early work which has formerly been attributed to Pollaiuolo and other artists. Covi thinks that it was probably painted with assistance from Ghirlandaio. It is now in London at the National Gallery.

The Baptism of Christ, now in the Uffizi Gallery at Florence, was painted in 1474–1475. In this work Verrocchio was assisted by Leonardo da Vinci, then a youth and a member of his workshop, who painted the angel on the left and the part of the background above. According to Giorgio Vasari, Andrea resolved never to touch the brush again because Leonardo, his pupil, had far surpassed him, but later critics consider this story apocryphal.

The Madonna enthroned with John the Baptist and St Donato is in the Pistoia Cathedral. It had been left unfinished and was completed by Lorenzo di Credi when Verrocchio was in Venice near the end of his life.

== Sculpture ==
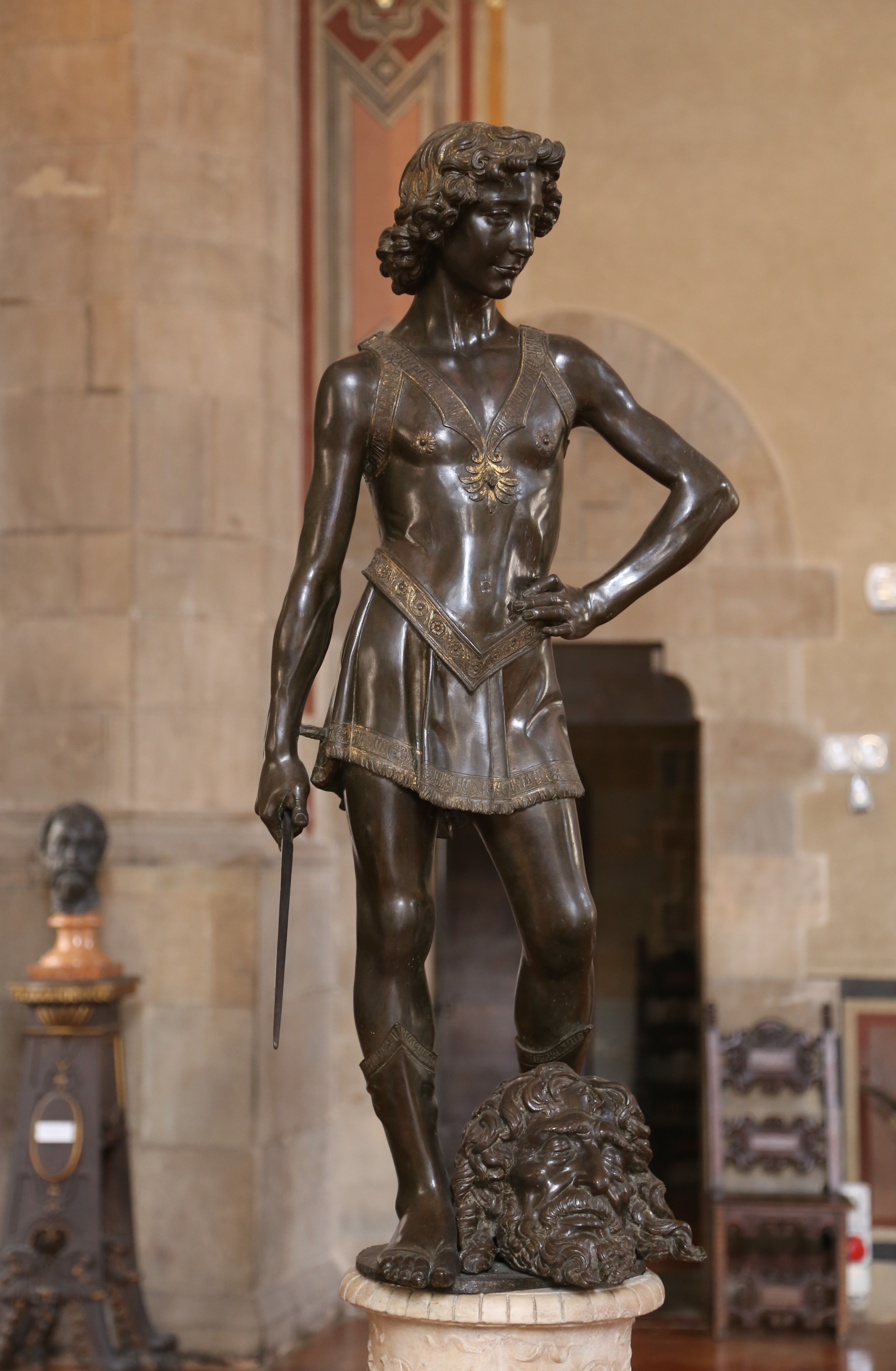
David, c. 1466–1469, Bargello, Florence

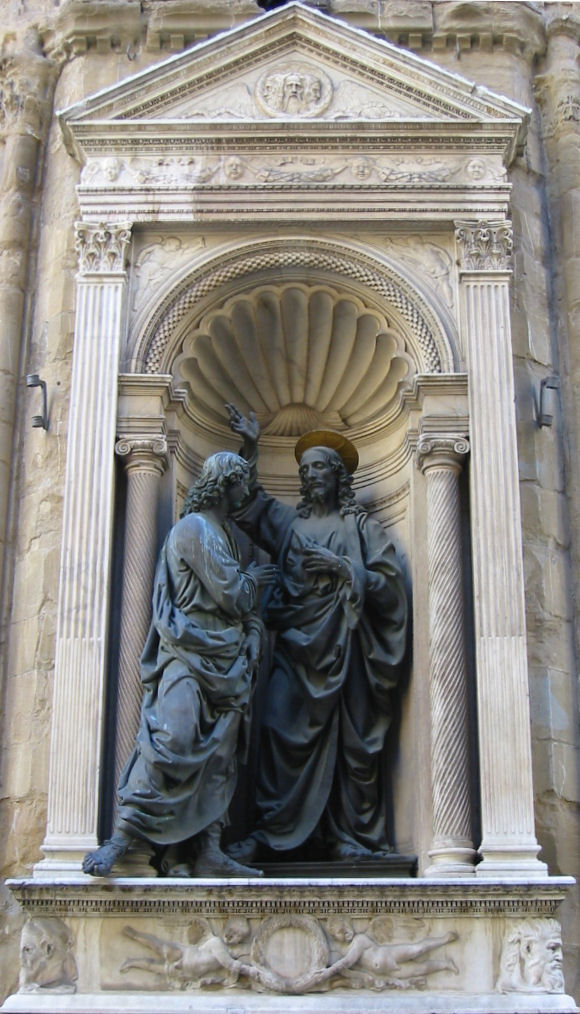
A copy of Christ and St Thomas, 1467–1483, in the niche all'antica by Donatello at Orsanmichele

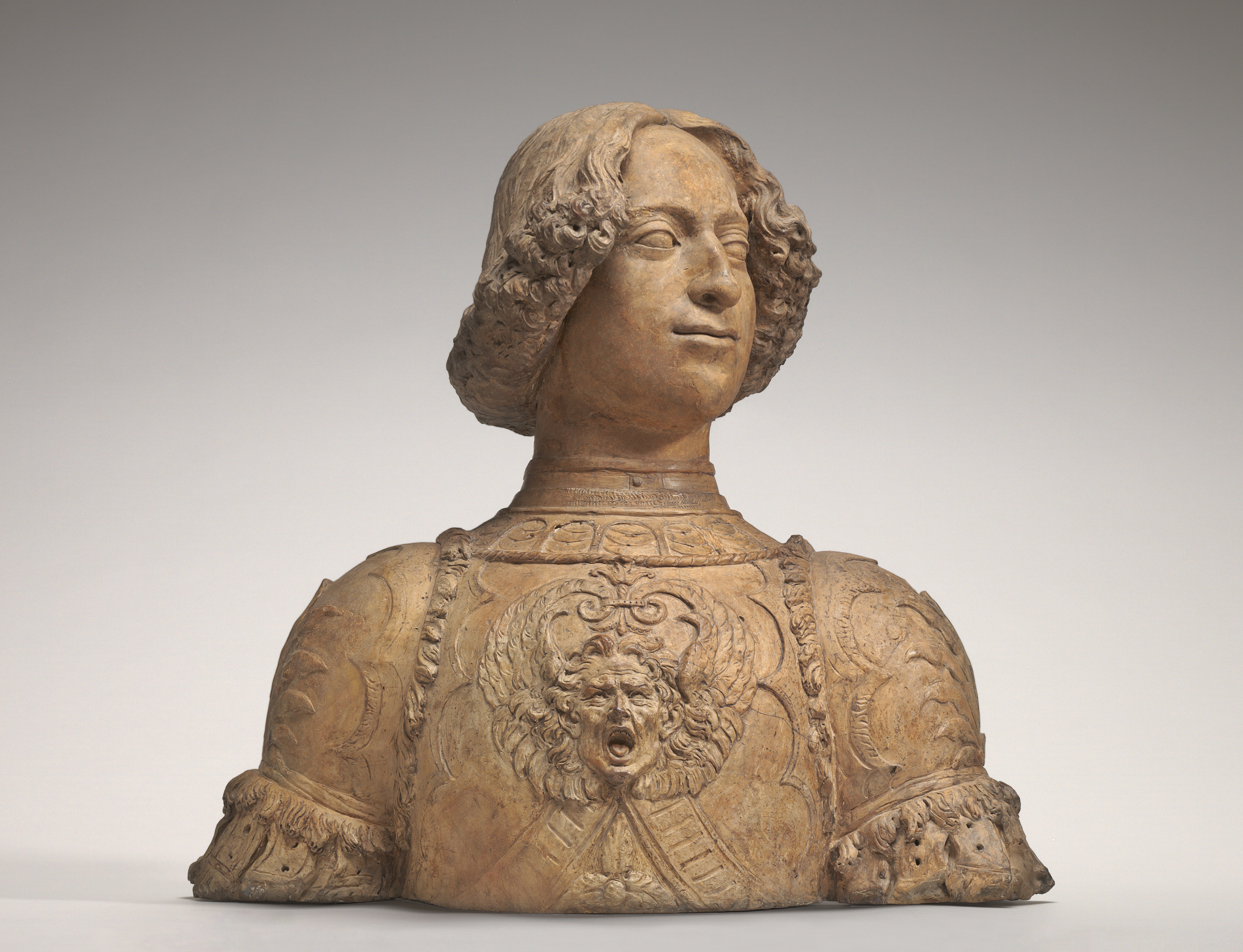
Giuliano de' Medici, c. 1475–1478, National Gallery of Art, Washington

Around 1465 Verrocchio is believed to have worked on the lavabo of the Old Sacristy in San Lorenzo, Florence.

Between 1465 and 1467 he executed the funerary monument to Cosimo de' Medici for the crypt under the altar of the same church, and in 1472 he completed the monument to Piero and Giovanni de' Medici in the Old Sacristy.

In 1467 the Tribunale della Mercanzia, the judicial organ of the Guilds in Florence, commissioned from Verrocchio a bronze group portraying Christ and St. Thomas for the central niche of the east facade of Orsanmichele, which the Tribunale had recently purchased, to replace Donatello's statue of St. Louis of Toulouse, which had been commissioned by the Parte Guelfa, that had lost their power. Verrocchio therefore had the problem of placing two statues (more than life size) in a niche originally intended for one. As Covi says, the problem was resolved "in a most felicitous manner". The work was placed in position in 1483 and "has been acclaimed since the day of its unveiling and almost without exception recognised as a masterpiece."

In 1468 Verrocchio made a bronze candlestick (1.57 metres high), now in the Rijksmuseum, Amsterdam, for the Signoria of Florence.

Also in 1468 he contracted to make a golden sphere (palla) to be placed on top of the lantern of Brunelleschi's cupola on the Duomo in Florence. The ball was ingeniously made of sheets of copper soldered together and hammered into shape and then gilded. It was completed by the spring of 1471. (The cross on top was made by other hands.) The ball was struck by lightning and fell on 27 January 1601 but was reconstructed in 1602.

In the early 1470s he made a voyage to Rome, where he made a relief for the Funerary Monument of Francesca Tornabuoni for Santa Maria sopra Minerva (now in the Bargello). In 1474 he executed the Funerary Monument to Cardinal Niccolo Forteguerri for the Cathedral of Pistoia, which he left unfinished.

A bronze statue of David was commissioned by Piero de' Medici. On grounds of style and technique it was dated by Butterfield to the mid-1460s; he considered it a masterpiece of Verrocchio's early career. It was purchased by the Signoria of Florence from Piero's heirs Lorenzo and Giuliano de' Medici in 1476 and is now at the Bargello in Florence. Verrocchio's David is a young lad, modestly clad, contrasting with Donatello's provocative David. For this figure, the master is purported to have used the young Leonardo, a newcomer to his workshop, as his model.

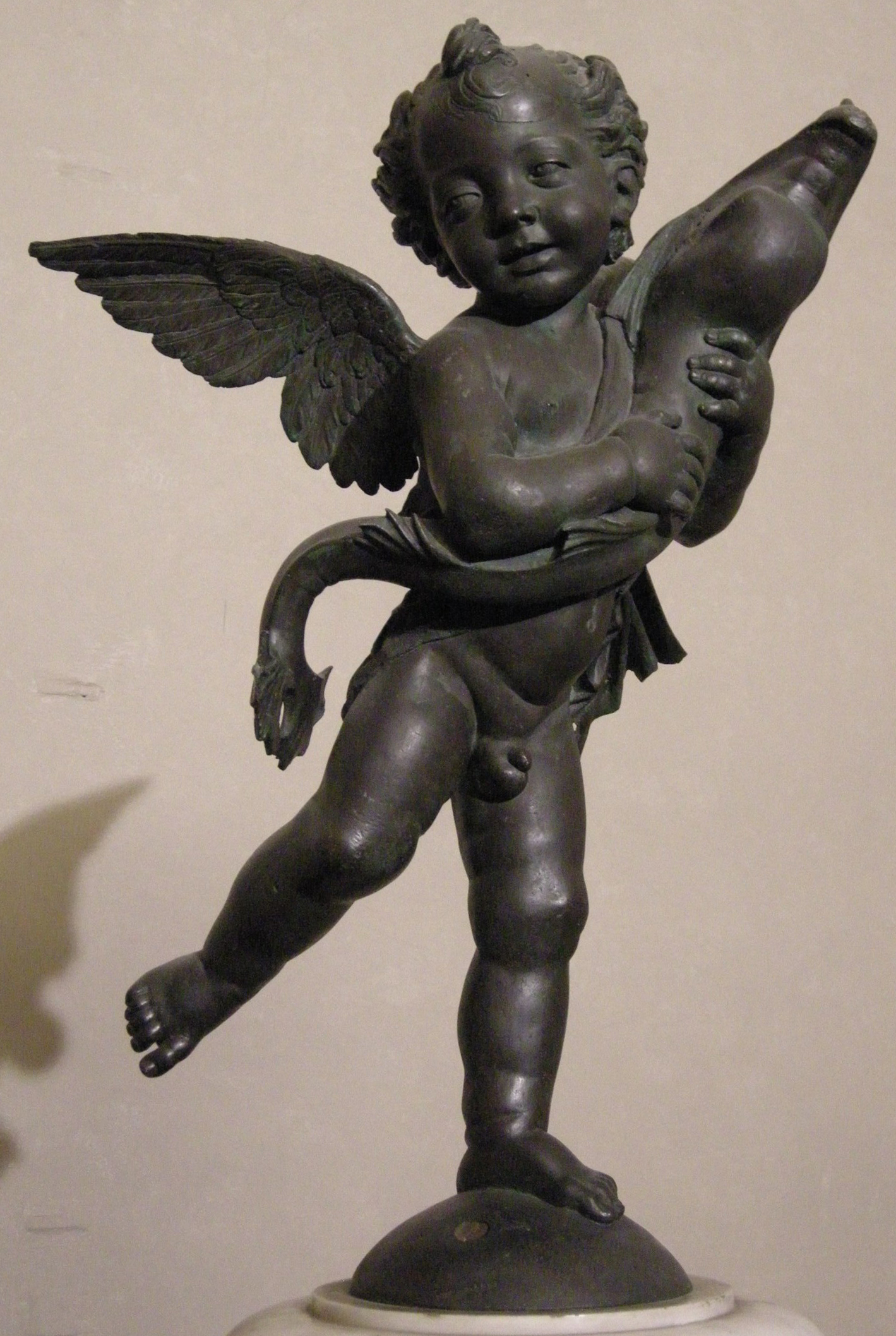
Putto with Dolphin for the Medici villa of Careggi

At a date unknown (suggestions range from 1465 to 1480: Pope-Hennessy said about 1470) he finished in bronze a Putto with Dolphin, originally intended for a fountain in the Medici villa of Careggi and later brought to Florence for a fountain in the Palazzo della Signoria by the Grand Duke Cosimo de' Medici. It was replaced with a copy by Bruno Bearzi and since 1959 has been kept in a room in the Palazzo Vecchio.

The marble bust of a Lady with a Bunch of Flowers (Dama col mazzolino) at the Bargello is probably from the later 1470s. The identity of the lady is unknown.

=== Equestrian Statue of Bartolomeo Colleoni ===
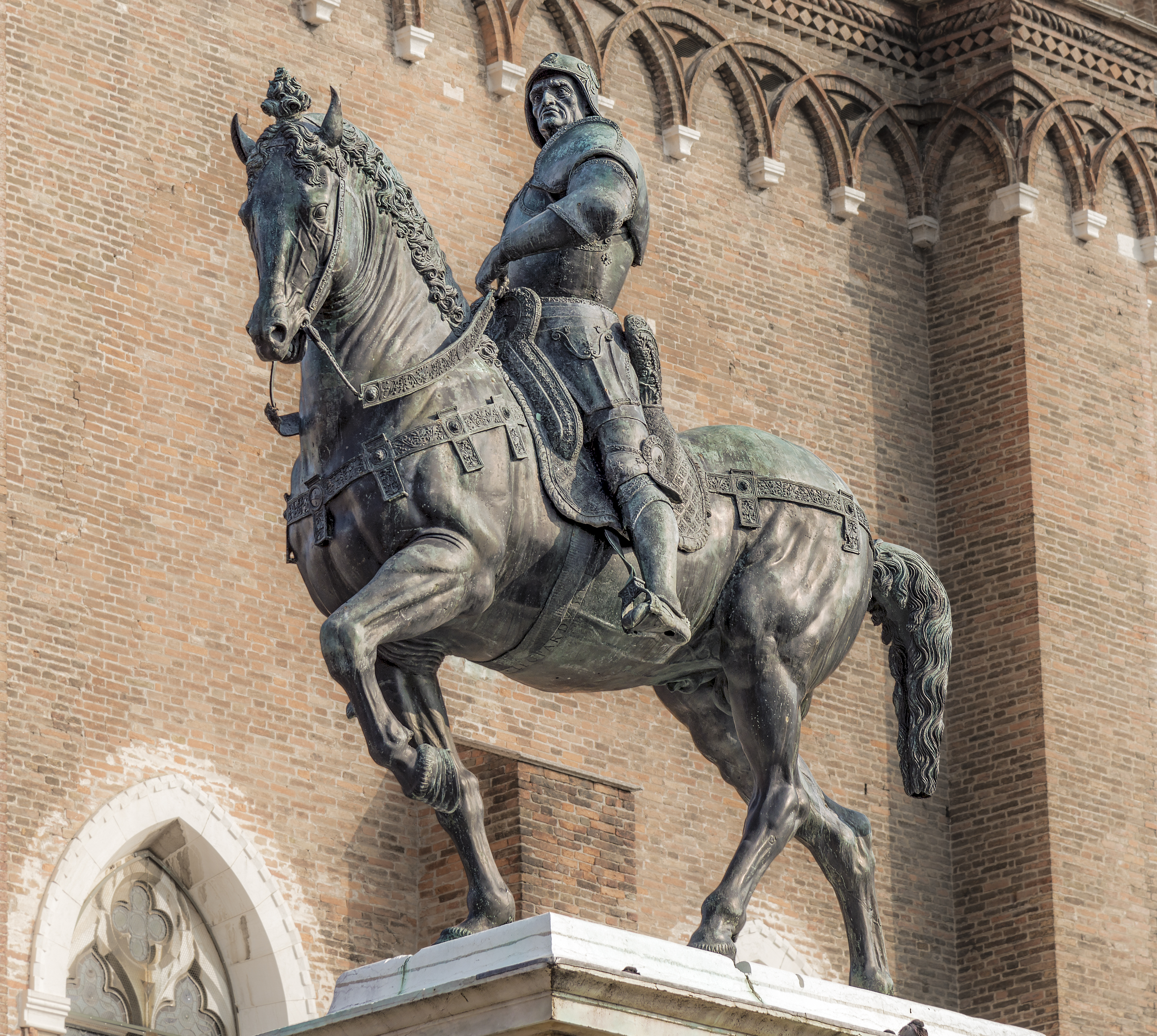
Statue of Bartolomeo Colleoni in Venice, Verrocchio, 1483–1488, cast by Leopardi

In 1475 the condottiero Colleoni, a former Captain General for the Republic of Venice, died and by his will left a substantial part of his estate to the Republic on condition that a statue of himself should be commissioned and set up in the Piazza San Marco. In 1479 the Republic announced that it would accept the legacy, but that (as statues were not permitted in the Piazza) the statue would be placed in the open space in front of the Scuola San Marco. A competition was arranged to enable a sculptor to be selected. Three sculptors competed for the contract, Verrocchio from Florence, Alessandro Leopardi from Venice and Bartolomeo Vellano from Padua. Verrocchio made a model of his proposed sculpture using wood and black leather, while the others made models of wax and clay. The three models were exhibited in Venice in 1483 and the contract was awarded to Verrocchio. He then opened a workshop in Venice and made the final clay model which was ready to be cast in bronze, but he died in 1488, before this was done. He had asked that his pupil Lorenzo di Credi, who was then in charge of his workshop in Florence, should be entrusted with the finishing of the statue, but after the considerable delay the Venetian state commissioned Leopardi to do this. The statue was eventually erected on a pedestal made by Leopardi in the piazza in front of Santi Giovanni e Paolo in Venice, where it stands today.

Leopardi cast the bronze very successfully and the statue is universally admired, but Pope-Hennessy suggests that, if Verrocchio had been able to do this himself, he would have finished the head and other parts more smoothly and made it even better than it is. Although it was not placed where Colleoni had intended, Passavent emphasised how fine it looks in its actual position, writing that "the magnificent sense of movement in this figure is shown to superb advantage in its present setting" and that, as sculpture, "it far surpasses anything the century had yet aspired to or thought possible". He points out that both man and horse are equally fine and together are inseparable parts of the sculpture.

Verrocchio is unlikely to have ever seen Colleoni and the statue is not a portrait of the man but of the idea of a strong and ruthless military commander "bursting with titanic power and energy". This is in contrast to Donatello's statue at Padua of the condottiere Erasmo da Narni known as Gattamelata with its "air of calm command" and all Verrocchio's effort "has been devoted to the rendering of movement and of a sense of strain and energy".

== Portrayals in media ==
Verrocchio is a character in Phil Melanson's historical novel "Florenzer", where he is featured as Leonardo da Vinci's mentor, is portrayed as a prolific artist, and provides a glimpse into the lives of LGBTQIA+ men living in Florence in the 1400s.
