= Statue of Frederick the Great =

Statue of Frederick the Great may refer to:

- Equestrian statue of Frederick the Great, Unter den Linden, Berlin, Germany
- Statue of Frederick the Great (Charlottenburg-Wilmersdorf), Berlin, Germany
- Statue of Frederick the Great (Szczecin), Poland
