= Portrait of Frederick the Great (Ziesenis) =

1763 painting by Johann Georg Ziesenis

Portrait of Frederick II of Prussia
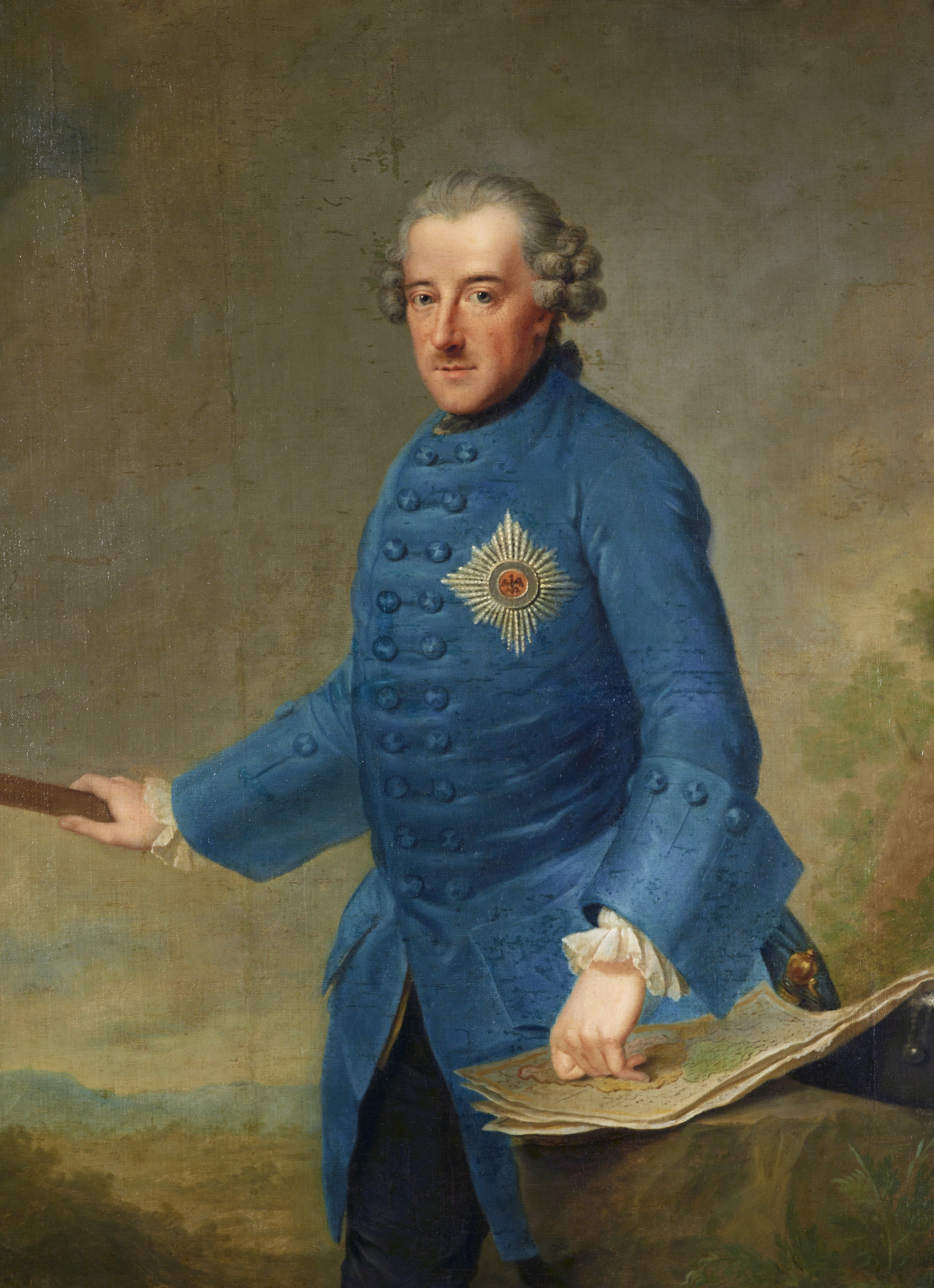
- Artist: Johann Georg Ziesenis
- Year: 1763
- Type: Oil on canvas, portrait painting
- Dimensions: 142 cm × 98 cm (56 in × 39 in)
- Location: Private collection

One of the many portraits of Frederick II of Prussia was painted by the German-Danish painter Johann Georg Ziesenis in 1763. In 1913, the archivist and historian Jean Lulvès (1866–1928), son of the painter Jean Lulvès, claimed it was the only painting for which Frederick sat during his lifetime. However, this is now doubted.

It was commissioned by Frederick's sister Duchess Philippine Charlotte of Brunswick-Wolfenbüttel. If the Prussian king really sat for it from 17 to 20 June 1763 at Castle Salzdahlum is not clear. Like other portraitists, Ziesenis continued working on portraits after the sitting using sketches. However, the facial features in this portrait appear highly idealized, which is inconsistent with the fact that Frederick considered himself very ugly and at the end of the Seven Years' War "complained in his letters of how much weight he had lost and how thin, fragile, and gray he had become." Consequently, Ziesenis's portrait does not seem to represent the true image of the monarch.

On 10 October 2009, the painting, last put on public display in 1937 at the Lower Saxony State Museum, was offered by the Bremen auction house Bolland & Marotz and sold at a price of 670,000 euros. Due to the historical significance of the painting, it was registered in the directory of German cultural heritage.

== Copies ==
It is believed that there are two copies which were given to the Duchess (now in the Heidelberg Palatinate Museum) and to George III of the United Kingdom (now in the Royal Collection).

== See also ==
Portraits of Frederick the Great
