= Frederick the Great Playing the Flute at Sanssouci =

Painting by Adolph Menzel

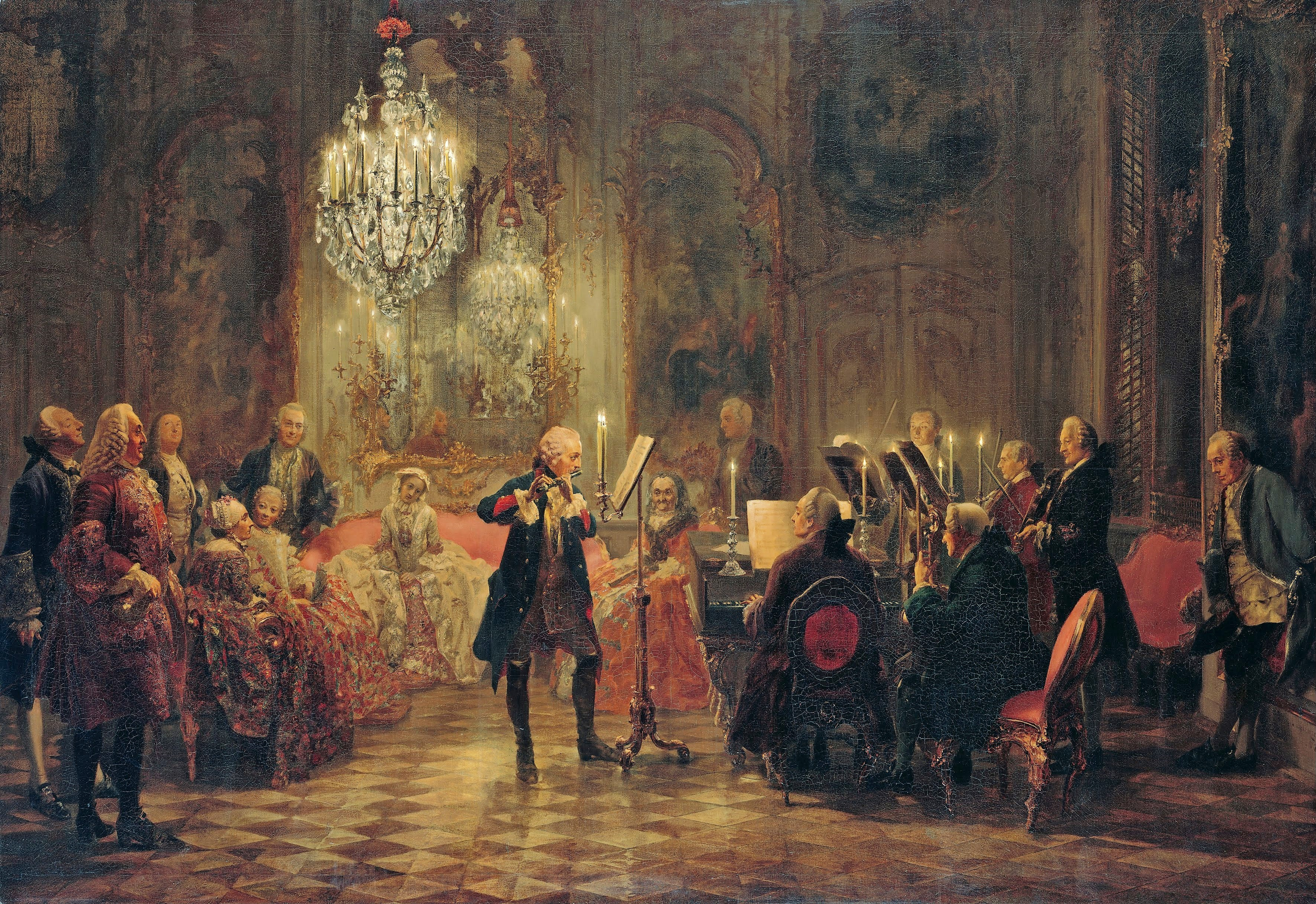
- Artist: Adolph Menzel
- Year: 1852
- Medium: oil on canvas
- Dimensions: 142 cm × 205 cm (56 in × 81 in)
- Location: Alte Nationalgalerie, Berlin

Frederick the Great Playing the Flute at Sanssouci or The Flute Concert is an 1852 oil on canvas history painting by the German painter Adolph Menzel. It depicts Frederick the Great, King of Prussia playing the flute at an evening concert at Sanssouci and is now in the Alte Nationalgalerie in Berlin.

Menzel was one of the most popular and important Realist painters of the 19th century, and was ennobled as Adolph von Menzel in 1898. His works form an important record of life in Prussia at the time. Several of his paintings and book illustrations are dedicated to the life of Frederick the Great. Sanssouci (meaning Free of Care), was Frederick's summer palace at Potsdam, near Berlin.

The painting depicts, in a pre-impressionistic, painterly 19th-century style, an 18th-century musical soirée at the palace at which a piece of music is being played with King Frederick himself playing the flute center stage. However, the monarch’s features represented in the painting are highly idealized as Menzel avoids showing Frederick with his aquiline nose, although he must have known the death mask of the Prussian king.

In front of Frederick sits his chamber ensemble and to his rear an audience of dignitaries and noble ladies. The focus of the work is not on the music but rather on Frederick and the ambience created by the interior design, the furniture, the chandelier and candlelight and the ladies' elaborate dresses.

The assembly is made up of some of the leading names of the day, namely:

- Johann Joachim Quantz, the king's flute teacher (standing far right)
- Franz Benda, Bohemian violinist and composer (on his right with a violin and a dark skirt)
- Carl Philipp Emanuel Bach, German musician and composer (harpsichord player)
- Gustav Adolf von Gotter, diplomat (foreground at left)
- Jakob Friedrich von Bielfeld, German writer and statesman (behind him)
- Pierre Louis Maupertuis, French mathematician and philosopher (behind him, looking up)
- Wilhelmine von Bayreuth, Frederick's sister (sitting on the pink couch)
- Amalie von Preussen, composer and also Frederick's sister (on her right, with a court lady)
- Carl Heinrich Graun, German composer and the court conductor (behind them)
- Countess Camas (elderly lady behind the music stand)
- Egmont von Chasot, friend of Frederick (behind her)

According to his own words, Menzel was not so much interested in depicting the people in his painting, but rather in showing the lighting situation with the many candles. He is said to have confessed to a visitor that he had "actually only painted the picture because of the chandelier".

The painting is quoted in Stanley Kubrick's 1975 film Barry Lyndon in a scene where the Lyndon's chaplain, Reverend Runt, is accompanied on the flute by Barry's wife and son.

== See also ==
- 100 Great Paintings, 1980 BBC series
- Portraits of Frederick the Great

== Bibliography ==
- Werner Busch, Adolph Menzel: The Quest for Reality (Los Angeles: Getty Research Institute, 2017), pp. 65, 139–145.
- Gabriele Busch-Salmen, “Adolf Menzels Flötenkonzert Friedrichs des Großen in Sanssouci: Ein vertrautes Gemälde, 150 Jahre nach seiner Fertigstellung neu gesehen”, Music in Art: International Journal for Music Iconography, 28, nos. 1–2 (Spring–Fall 2003), pp. 127–146.
- Jost Hermand, Adolph Menzel: Das Flötenkonzert in Sanssouci: Ein realistisch geträumtes Preußenbild (Frankfurt am Main: Fischer Taschenbuch Verlag, 1985).
- Hubertus Kohle, Adolph Menzels Friedrich-Bilder: Theorie und Praxis der Geschichtsmalerei im Berlin der 1850er Jahre (Munich: Deutscher Kunstverlag, 2001), pp. 75–80.
- Günther Thiersch, “Das Flötenkonzert”, in Deutsche Maler im 19. Jahrhundert: Zwanzig Meisterwerke aus dem Besitz der Nationalgalerie Berlin, Staatliche Museen Preußischer Kulturbesitz (Stuttgart: Ernst Klett Verlag, 1979), pp. 130–140.
