= Margaretha Ziesenis =

German artist

Margaretha Ziesenis was a German portrait painter and miniaturist. She was a daughter of the painter Johann Georg Ziesenis and sister of the painter Maria Elisabeth Ziesenis. Besides portraits, she also produced copies in miniature of the works of other painters.
