= Maria Elisabeth Ziesenis =

German artist (1744–1796)

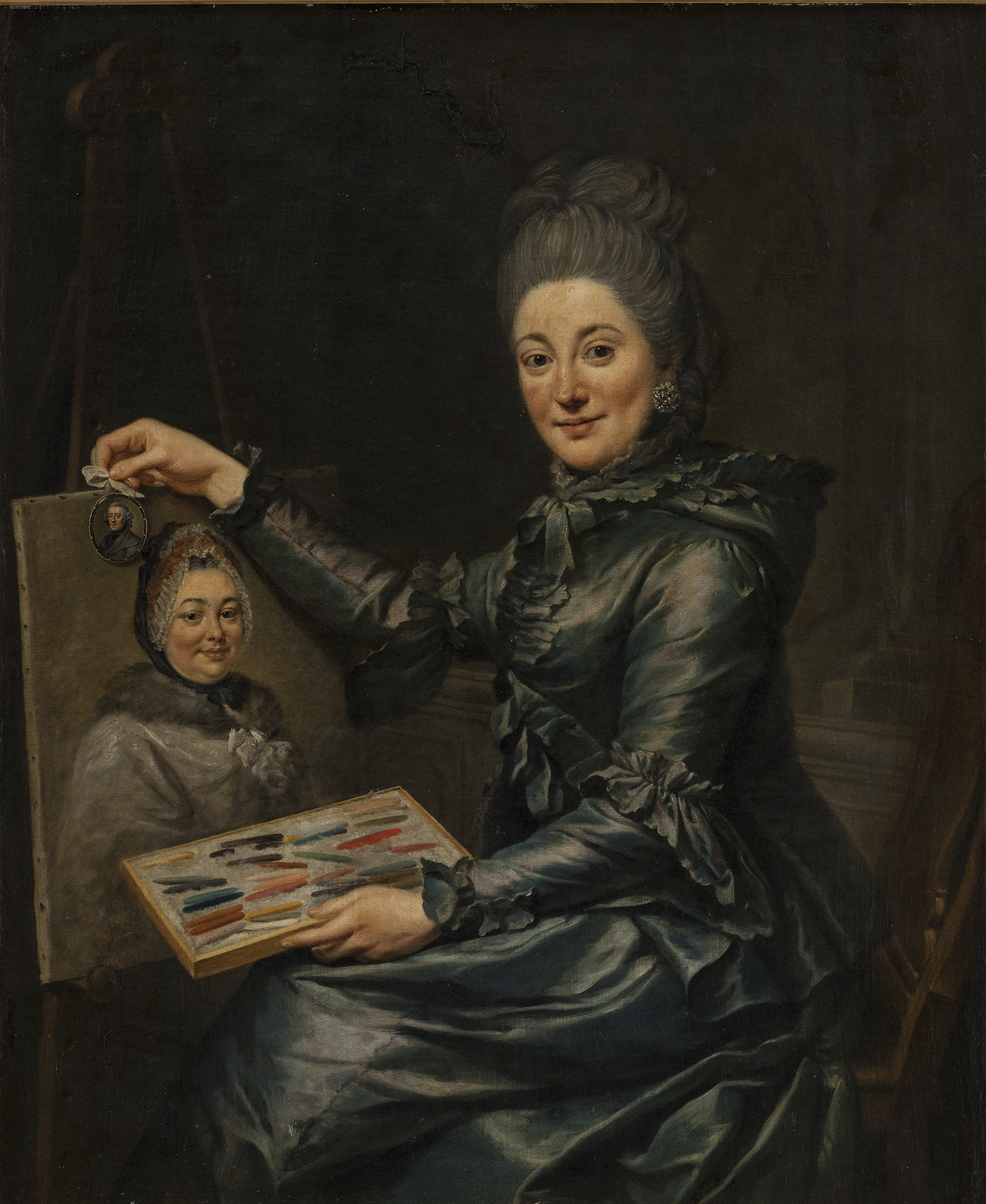
Maria Elisabeth Ziesenis

Maria Elisabeth Ziesenis, later Lampe (July 26, 1744 – August 24, 1796) was a German painter.

Born in Frankfurt am Main, Ziesenis was a daughter of Johann Georg Ziesenis, who was also her teacher, and sister of fellow painter Margaretha Ziesenis.

In 1776, she married Johann Bodo Lampe (1738–1802), the königlicher Leibchirurgus who directed the botanical garden in Hanover. She worked during her career in oils and sometime in pastel, and produced miniature paintings as well. In 1780, she became a member of the Kassel Akademie; upon that occasion she exhibited a self-portrait in pastel and was classed as an amateur. A pair of surviving pastels show a great deal of attention to detail, especially in the depiction of the sitters' clothing and accessories.
