= Palace of the Pomeranian Estates Assembly =

Baroque palace in Szczecin, Poland

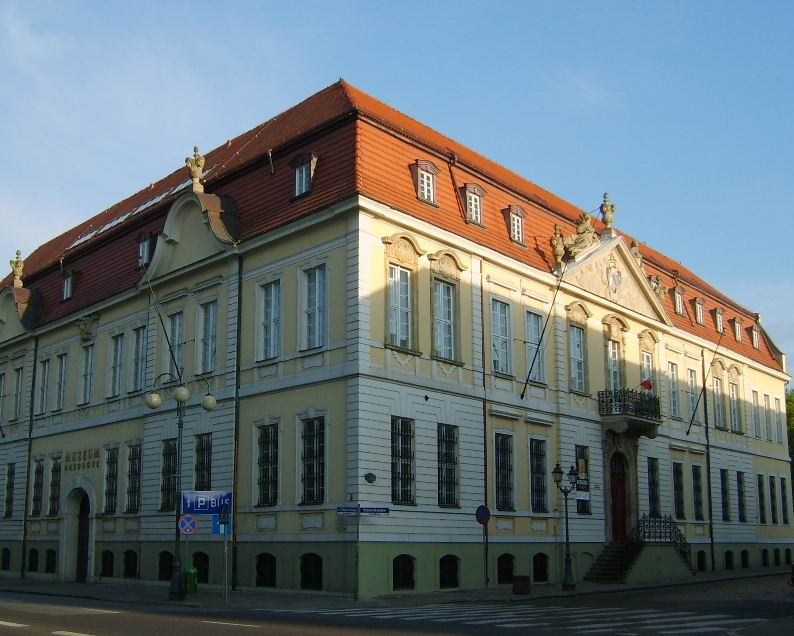
- The building in 2008.
- Interactive map of the Palace of the Pomeranian Estates Assembly area

General information
- Type: Palace
- Architectural style: Baroque
- Location: Szczecin, Poland, 27 Staromłyńska Street
- Coordinates: 53°25′41.16″N 14°33′16.96″E
- Construction started: 1726
- Completed: 1729
- Renovated: 1885–1888, 1926–1927
- Owner: National Museum in Szczecin

Technical details
- Floor count: 4

Design and construction
- Architect: Gerhard Cornelius von Walrave
- Developer: Frederick William I of Prussia

The Palace of the Pomeranian Estates Assembly (Polish: Pałac Sejmu Stanów Pomorskich), also known as the Old Estates Building (Polish: Stary Dom Ziemiaństwa; German: Altes Landeshaus), is a historical Baroque palace in Szczecin, Poland, located at 27 Staromłyńska Street in the Old Town neighbourhood. It houses the Museum of Regional Traditions, a division of the National Museum in Szczecin.

It was designed by Gerhard Cornelius von Walrave, and constructed between 1726 and 1729. It originally housed the Pomeranian Estates Assembly, a governing body of the Province of Pomerania, and also served as the royal residence for when the monarch of Prussia would visit the city. From 1823 to 1927, it hosted of the Provincial Assembly of the Province of Pomerania, and from 1928 to 1945, it was used by the Pomeranian State Museum, which was then replaced by the Szczecin National Museum.

== History ==
The building was commissioned by king Frederick William I of Prussia, and constructed between 1726 and 1729. It was designed by architect Gerhard Cornelius von Walrave, while the construction was overseen by Hans J. Reinecke and J.H. Trippel. The façade sculptures were done by Barthelémy Damart. It housed the Pomeranian Estates Assembly, a governing body of the Province of Pomerania, and also served as the royal residence for when the king would visit the city.

On 10 October 1793, in front of the building, at the nearby Polish Soldier Square (then known as the White Parade Square), was unveiled a marble statue of Frederick the Great, the King of Prussia and Elector of Brandenburg from 1740 to 1786, made by Johann Gottfried Schadow. In 1877, as it began deteriorating due to atmospheric damage, it was relocated inside. It was removed in 1942, and returned to the building in 2015.

In 1823, the Estates Assembly was replaced by the Provincial Assembly of the Province of Pomerania, which continued to use the building. It was expanded between 1885 and 1888, with addition of a new wing, and enlargement of the old wing at Staromłyńska Street. In 1927, the assembly moved to the new headquarters, located in the current Szczecin City Hall. The building was renovated between 1926 and 1927, and in 1928, it began housing the Pomeranian State Museum (German: Pommersches Landesmuseum). In 1945, after the Second World War, it became one of two buildings of the Szczecin Municipal Museum, since 1947, known as the Museum of Western Pomerania, and since 1970, as the National Museum in Szczecin. Currently, it houses its administration, and the division known as the Museum of Regional Traditions.

== Characteristics ==
The four-storey building was designed in Baroque style, with bossage façade, richly decorated window trims, as well as the balcony railing over the main entrance. At the top, it has a tympanum, featuring the coat of arms of Prussia with panoply. On top of it are two sculptures of people in a half-lying pose, with figure of a woman on the left holding a mirror and a snake, and a man on the right, a scale and a sword. They are personifications of prudence and justice respectively. Below it, and above the main entrance, is placed the nine-field coat of arms of Pomerania. The building has a gambrel roof. They are surrounded by three sculptures of vase decorated with human faces.

== Gallery ==
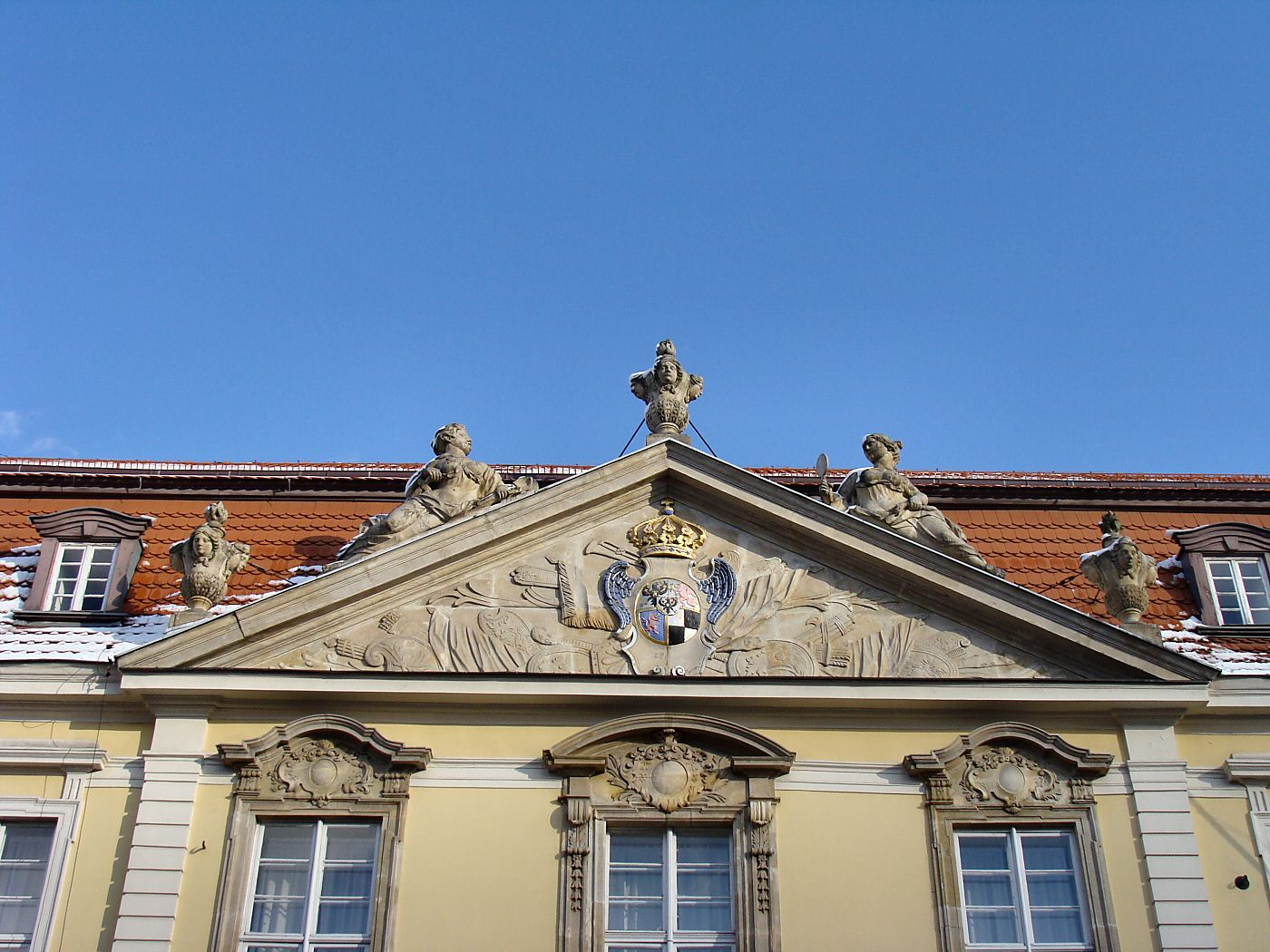
The tympanum with the coat of arms of Prussia.

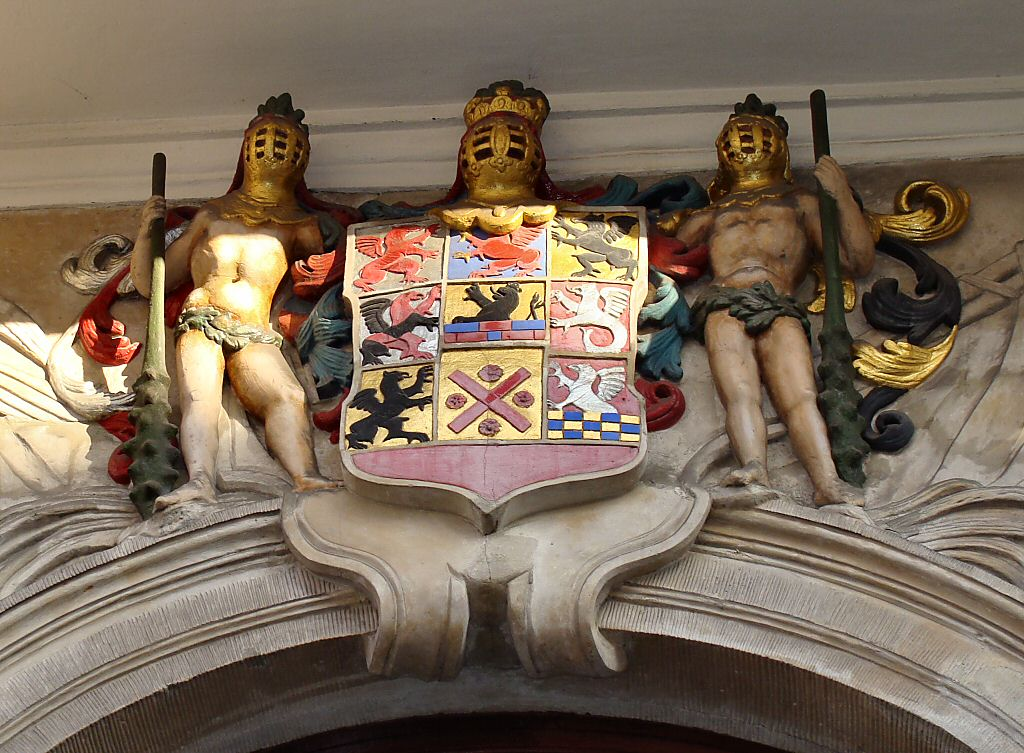
The coat of arms of Pomerania.
