= Jean Lulvès =

French painter

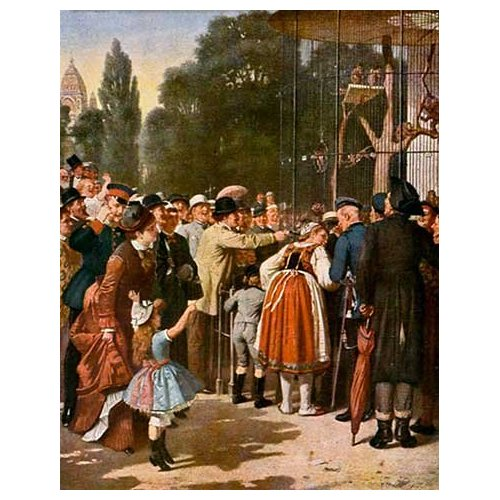
Sightseers outside the monkey house

Jean Lulvès (26 November 1833 – 8 January 1889) was a Franco-German painter, specializing in genre painting and decorative works for large rooms such as the Coronation Hall in the Kremlin and the now-lost headquarters of the Krause bank in Berlin. He often painted historical scenes, specializing in those from the 16th, 17th and 18th centuries .

== Life ==
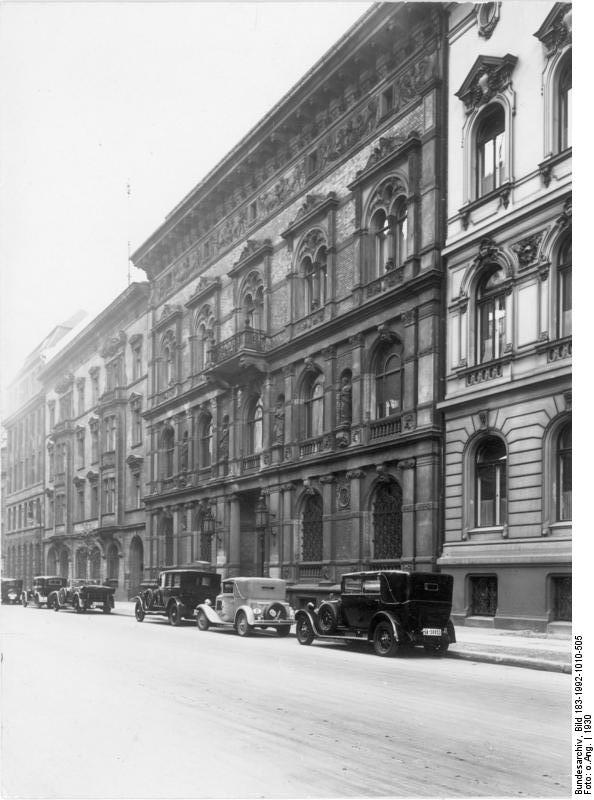
The Krause Bank, now lost

He was born in Mulhouse, Alsace. He was the son of Antoine Frédéric Lulvès, a copper-worker and -engraver from Hanover who worked in Rouen.

Lulvès initially worked as an engineer in France, Belgium and Germany before studying in Carl Steffeck's studio in Berlin from 1862 onwards. In 1863–64, he was employed by Baron Moller on Ösel Island. He next went to Moscow, where he worked on the decoration of the Alexander Nevsky Rooms in the Kremlin. He went to Rome in 1865 before returning to Berlin, where he took over producing the wax-paintings for the ballroom at the Krause Bank. From 1862, he regularly exhibited genre pictures at the academy.

His paintings included The Painter Clouet at the Louvre, The Secret Reunion, The Murder of Rizzio, The Historical Murder Site, Court Scenes, A Musical Young Man, Lioness with her young. The Marionettes (Museum Mülhausen i.E.) and Little Lever (Stadtmuseum Königsberg). He also produced the illustrations for A. Traeger's Deutsche Kunst, the Illustrierte Zeitung (Leipzig), Lipperheide's Illustrierte Frauenzeitung, Schorers Familienblatt, Daheim, Über Land and other works. His son Dr. Jean Lulvès (1866–1928) worked as an archivist, historian and genealogist and wrote a series of historical publications.

Lulvès died in 1889 in Berlin.

== Bibliography (in German) ==
- Adolf Rosenberg: Die Berliner Malerschule 1819–1879, Berlin 1879.
- Hermann Alexander Müller: Biographisches Künstler-Lexikon, Leipzig 1882, S.344.
- Friedrich von Boetticher: Malerwerke des 19.Jahrhunderts, Bd.I,2. Dresden 1891.
- Thieme-Becker: Allgemeines Lexikon der bildenden Künste, Bd.23, Leipzig 1992, S.462/463.
