= Johann Georg Ziesenis =

German painter

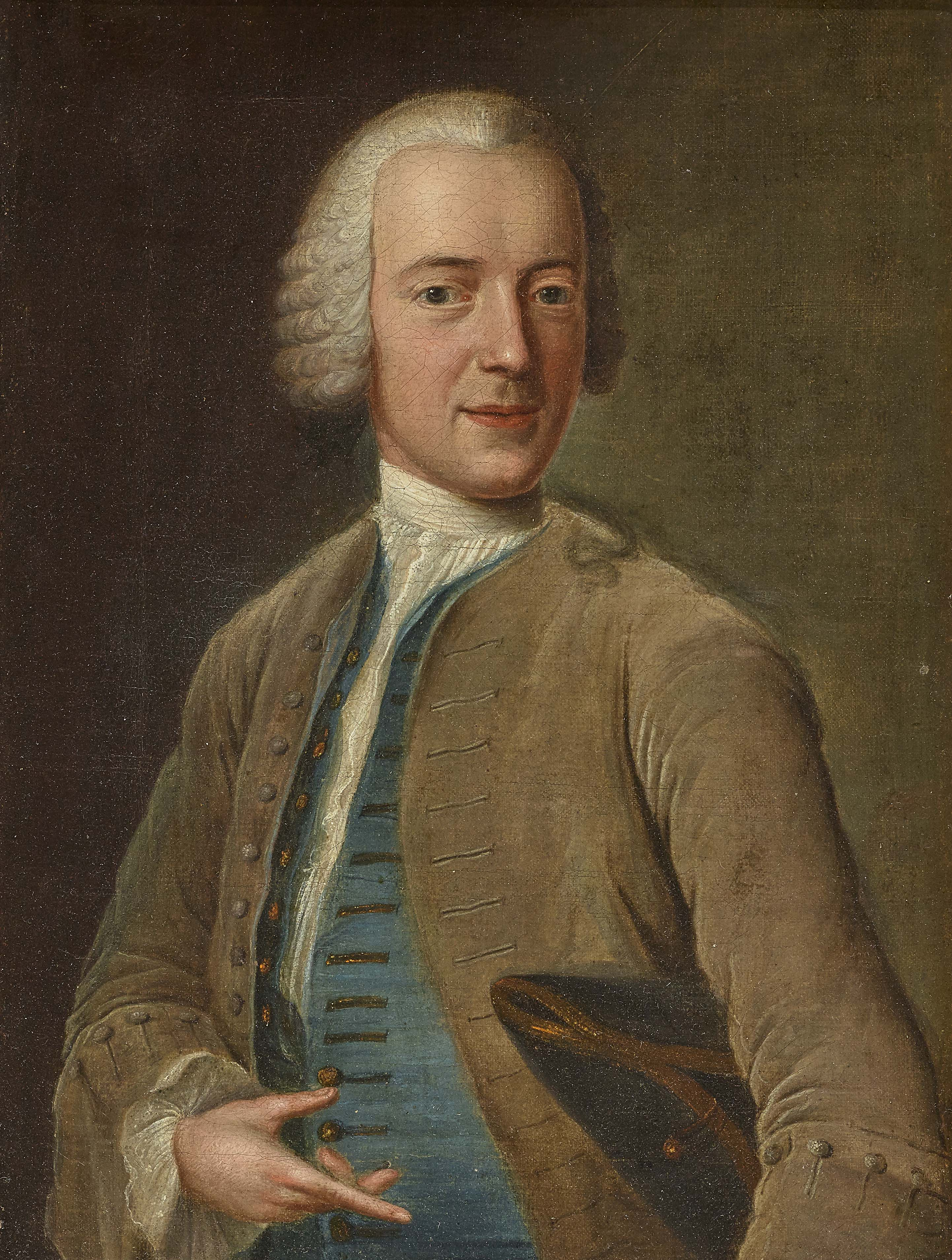
- Self portrait, c. 1743
- Born: 1716; Copenhagen, Denmark–Norway
- Died: 4 March 1776 (aged 59–60); Hannover, Prussia
- Occupation: Portrait painter
- Children: Maria and Margaretha

Johann Georg Ziesenis (1716 – 4 March 1776) was a German–Danish portrait painter.

== Early life and education ==
Ziesenis' father Johan Jürgen Ziesenis was a painter from Hanover, who was granted Danish citizenship in Copenhagen in 1709 and whose works included Baptism of Christ (173) for Copenhagen's Garrison Church. After drawing lessons from his father, Johann lived in Düsseldorf, where he received further training and painted several portraits of the royal family.

== Career ==
In 1764, Ziesenis became court painter in Hanover and in 1766, he was granted 400 kroner by the Danish king "for travel and other expenses". In 1768, he was in The Netherlands, where he produced portraits of William V, his wife and family. He also worked for the courts in Brunswick and Berlin and his daughters Maria and Margaretha were also painters.

Ziesenis created around 260 portraits and other paintings and sketches in the course of his life, including ones of Crown Prince Frederik in 1767, now on display at Fredensborg Palace, Frederick II and Charlotte of Mecklenburg-Strelitz, future wife of King George III of Great Britain.

In 1764, while in his sixties, he painted a portrait of Hans Egede.

== Selected portraits ==
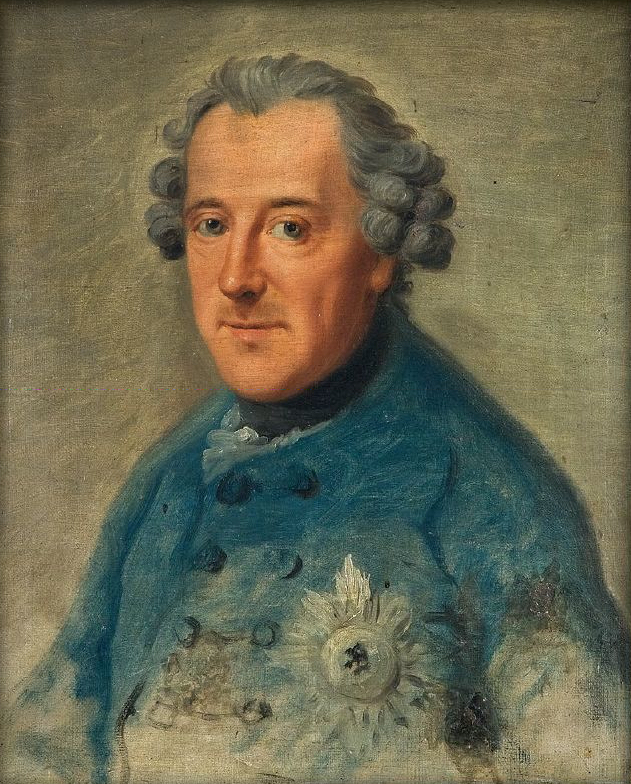
Frederick the Great

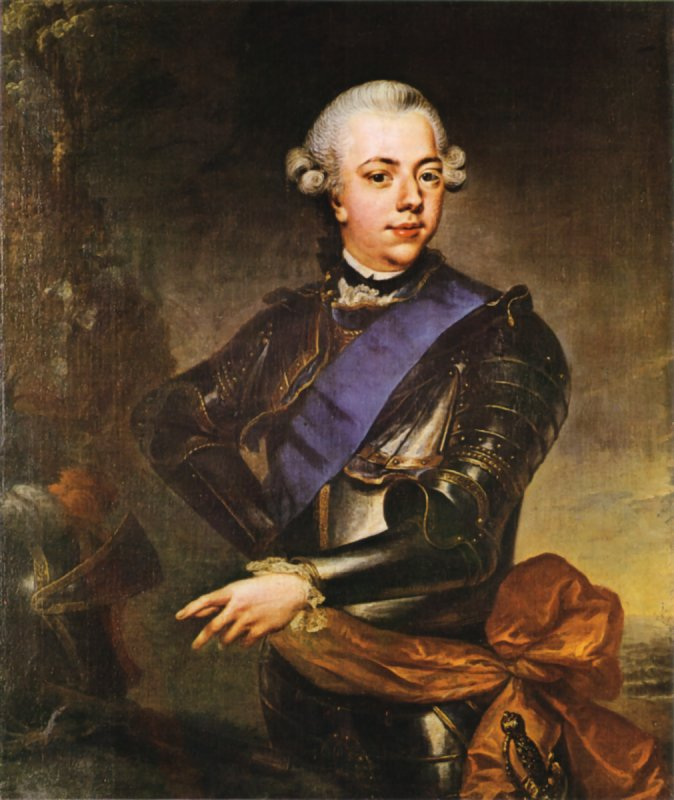
William V, Prince of Orange

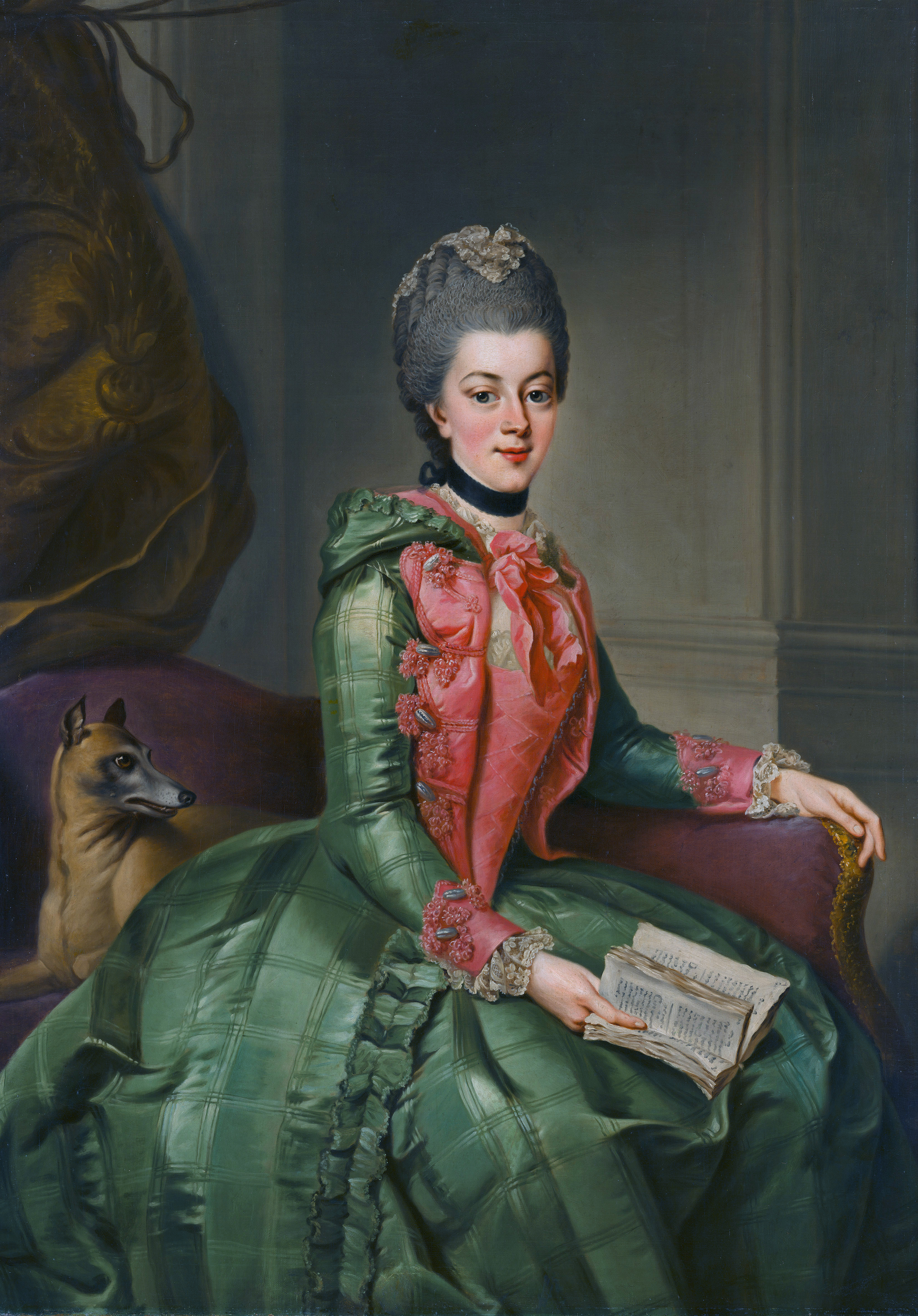
Wilhelmina of Prussia

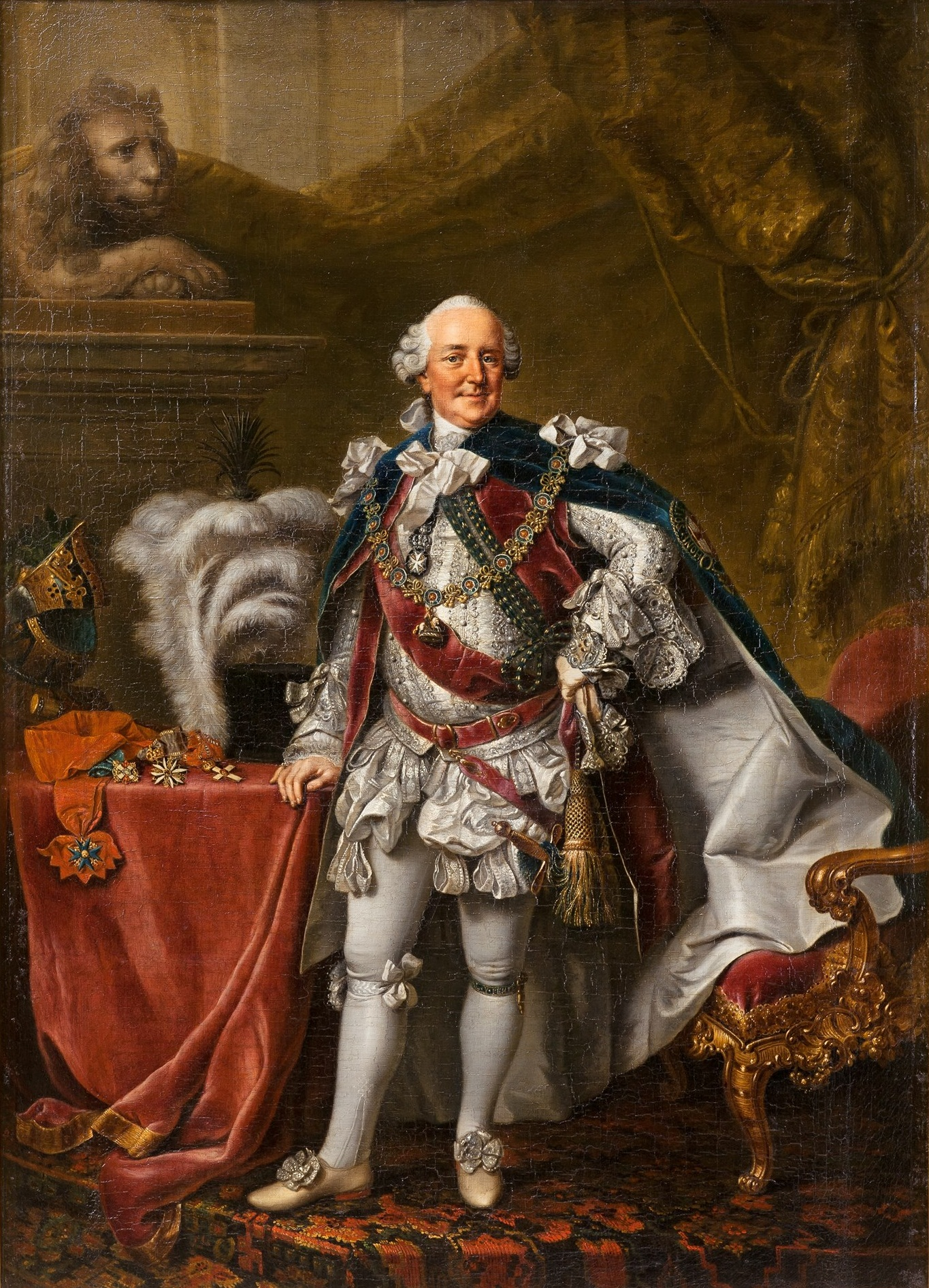
Duke Ferdinand of Brunswick-Wolfenbüttel

== Sources ==
- 2 artworks by or after Johann Georg Ziesenis at the Art UK site
- Arthur Herman Lier: Ziesenis, Johann Georg. In: General German Biography (ADB). Volume 45, Duncker & Humblot, Leipzig, 1900, p 213
- Karin Schrader: The Ziesenis portrait painter Johann Georg (1716–1776) – Life and Work with a critical oeuvre catalog. Münster, Lit Verlag, 1995.
- German Biographical Encyclopedia, vol 10, p 660
- Johann Georg Ziesenis the Younger. In: Ulrich Thieme, Felix Becker among others: general lexicon of visual artists from antiquity to the present. Volume 36, EA Seemann, Leipzig, 1947, p 497
- VC Hawk: The Art of Lower Saxony Circle, 1930, p 305-307
- Helmut Zimmermann: The painter Elisabeth Ziesenis in: Hannover historical music, New Series 14 (1960), pp. 143–148
- A. von Rohr: Father and daughter Ziesenis in: home country. Journal of History, Conservation, Cultural Care, ed. from Heimatbund Lower Saxony eV, Hanover 1905ff, here., 1983, pp. 40–44
- Landesmuseum Hannover: John Frederick, John George, Elizabeth Ziesenis: Hannoversches Rococo, exhibition publication, Hanover, 1937
