= Statue of Frederick the Great (Charlottenburg-Wilmersdorf) =

Monument in Berlin, Germany

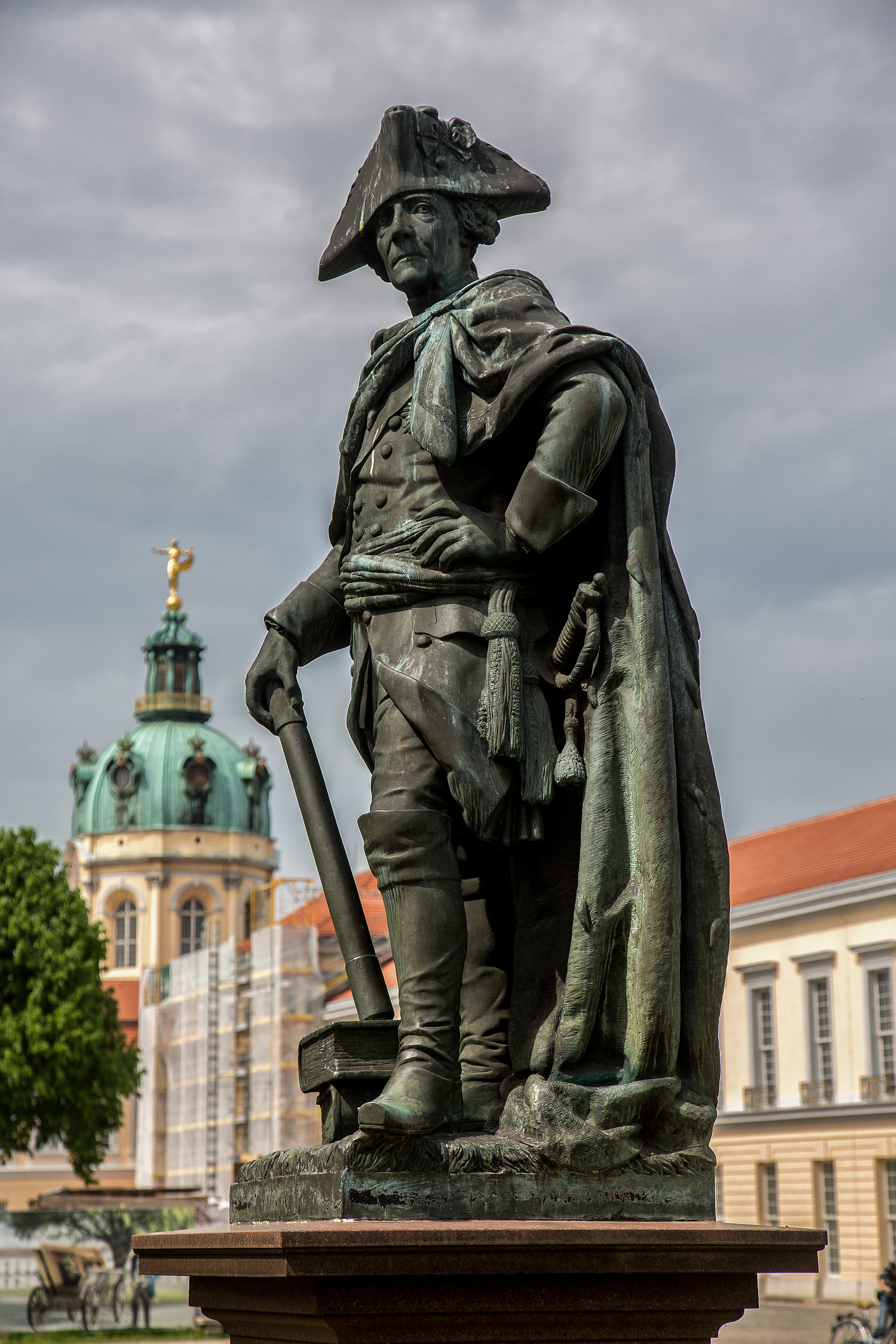
- The statue in 2015.
- Interactive map of Statue of Frederick the Great
- Location: 10–22 Spandauer Damm Street, Charlottenburg-Wilmersdorf, Berlin, Germany
- Coordinates: 52°31′14.19″N 13°17′54.91″E
- Type: Statue
- Material: Bronze
- Height: 2.5 m (8.2 ft; statue)
- Opening date: 1975
- Dedicated to: Frederick the Great

The statue of Frederick the Great (German: Denkmal Friedrich II.) is a monument in the city of Berlin, Germany, within the borough of Charlottenburg-Wilmersdorf. It is displayed in front of the new wing of the Charlottenburg Palace, a historic Baroque and Rococo palace from 1713, located on 10–22 Spandauer Damm Street, which formerly served as the residence of the King of Prussia. The monument has a form of a bronze statue, depicing Frederick the Great, who was the King of Prussia and the Elector of Brandenburg from 1740 to 1786, who oversaw the major expansion of the palace. It was created in 1975, and is a replica of he 1793 marble statue of Frederick the Great, created by Johann Gottfried Schadow, and displayed in Szczecin, Poland.

== History ==
The monument was created in 1975, being cast in bronze at Hermann Noack founday in Berlin, Germany. It was unveiled in front of the new wing of the Charlottenburg Palace, a historic Baroque and Rococo palace in Berlin, dating to from 1713, which formerly served as the residence of the King of Prussia. The monument is a replica of the 1793 marble statue of Frederick the Great, created by Johann Gottfried Schadow, and displayed in Szczecin, Poland.

== Characteristics ==
The statue is placed in front of the new wing of Charlottenburg Palace, a historic Baroque and Rococo palace from 1713. It depicts Frederick the Great, the King of Prussia and the Elector of Brandenburg from 1740 to 1786, wearing a military uniform, a mantle, a tricorne hat, and riding boots, as well as a pistol and a saber attached to his belt. He holds a baton in his right hand, the bottom of which, he rests on two books stacked on the floor, featuring Latin titles Artes pacis et belli (lit. 'the arts of peace and war') and Corpus Juris Fried (lit. 'the body of law'). The statue measures 2.5 metres (8.2 ft) is placed on a tall bronze pedestal.

== Gallery ==
The statue with a pedestal.

== See also ==
- Equestrian statue of Frederick the Great, another monument in Berlin dedicated to Frederick the Great
- Statue of Frederick the Great (Szczecin), the original sculpture, displayed in Szczecin, Poland
