= Sophie Caroline von Camas =

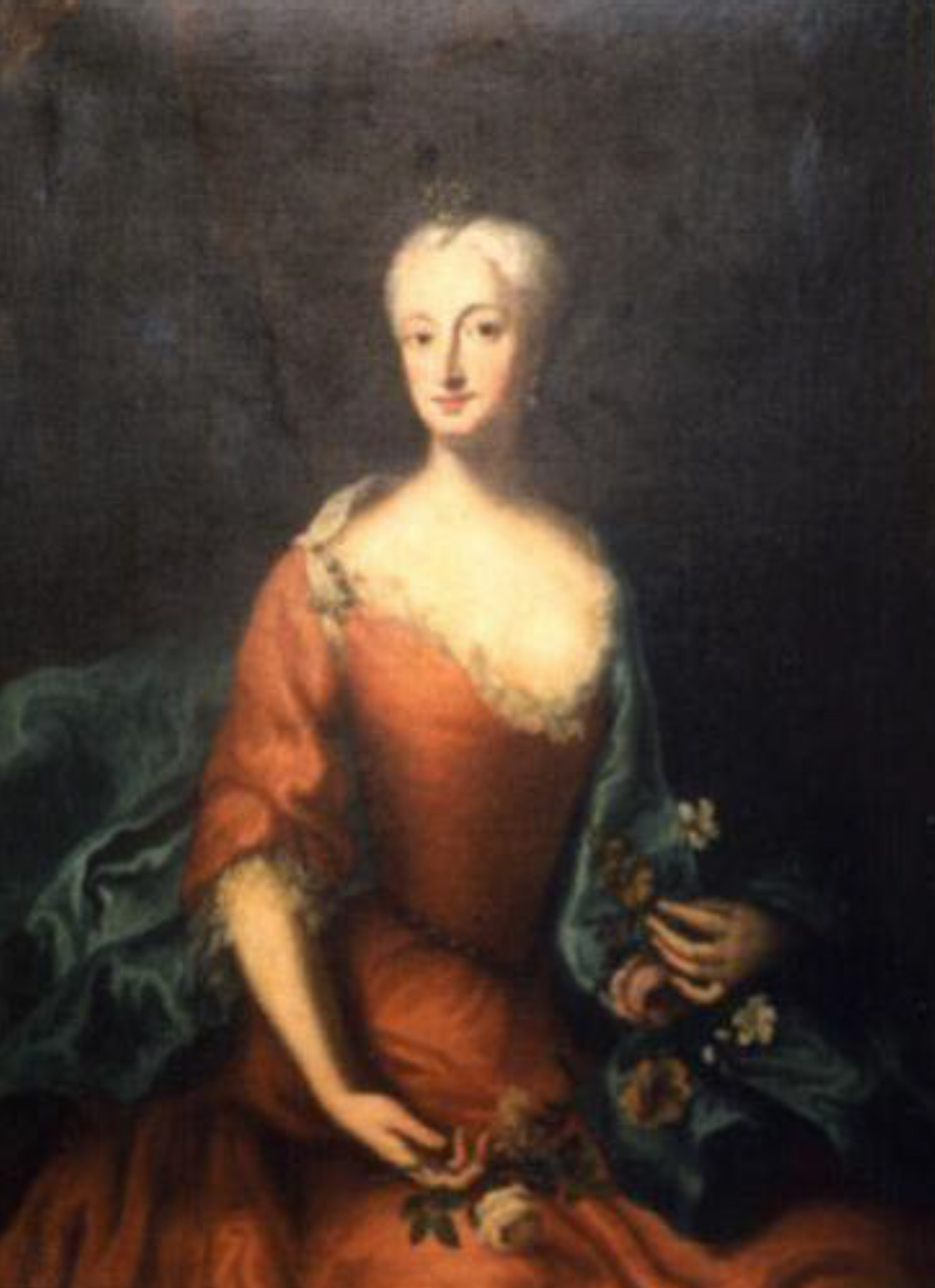
Portrait painting of Sophia Caroline von Camas

Sophie Caroline von Camas (1686 – 1766) was a Prussian courtier. She is known as a personal confidant and adviser of king Frederick the Great.

She was the daughter of general Wilhelm von Brandt and married colonel Paul Heinrich Tilio de Camas. In 1742, her spouse was made count and she was appointed Oberhofmeisterin to the queen, Elisabeth Christine of Brunswick-Wolfenbüttel-Bevern.

Von Camas was one of the very few women accepted in the intimate circle of Frederick the Great, who had befriended her when he was a crown prince; he appreciated her intelligence, called her Mama, confided in her in both political and personal issues and sometimes heeded her advice. Their correspondence has been preserved.
