= Statue of Frederick the Great (Szczecin) =

1793 marble sculpture in Szczecin, Poland

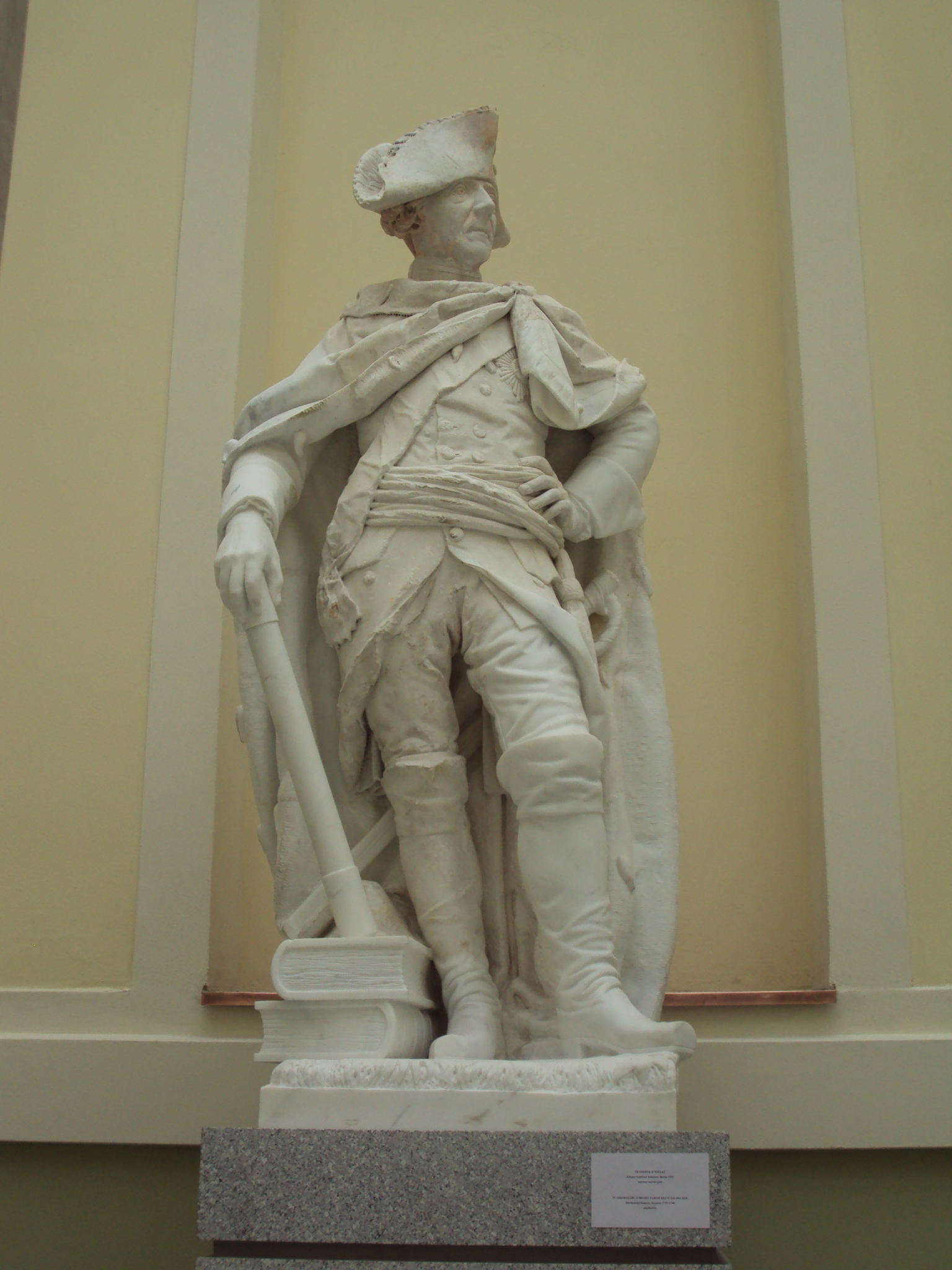
- The statue in 2016.
- Artist: Johann Gottfried Schadow
- Completion date: 10 October 1793
- Medium: Marble
- Subject: Frederick the Great
- Dimensions: 250 cm (98 in)
- Weight: 3.5 t
- Condition: Standing, renovated
- Location: Museum of Regional Traditions, Szczecin, West Pomeranian Voivodeship, Poland; 53°25′40.22″N 14°33′18.82″E

The statue of Frederick the Great (Polish: Pomnik Fryderyka II Wielkiego; German: Denkmal Friedrich II.) is a marble statue sculpted by Johann Gottfried Schadow, and unveiled in 1793. Currently, it is displayed in the Museum of Regional Traditions, a branch of the Szczecin National Museum, within the Palace of the Pomeranian Estates Assembly in Szczecin in West Pomeranian Voivodeship, Poland. It depicts Frederick the Great, who was the King of Prussia and the Elector of Brandenburg from 1740 to 1786.

== History ==
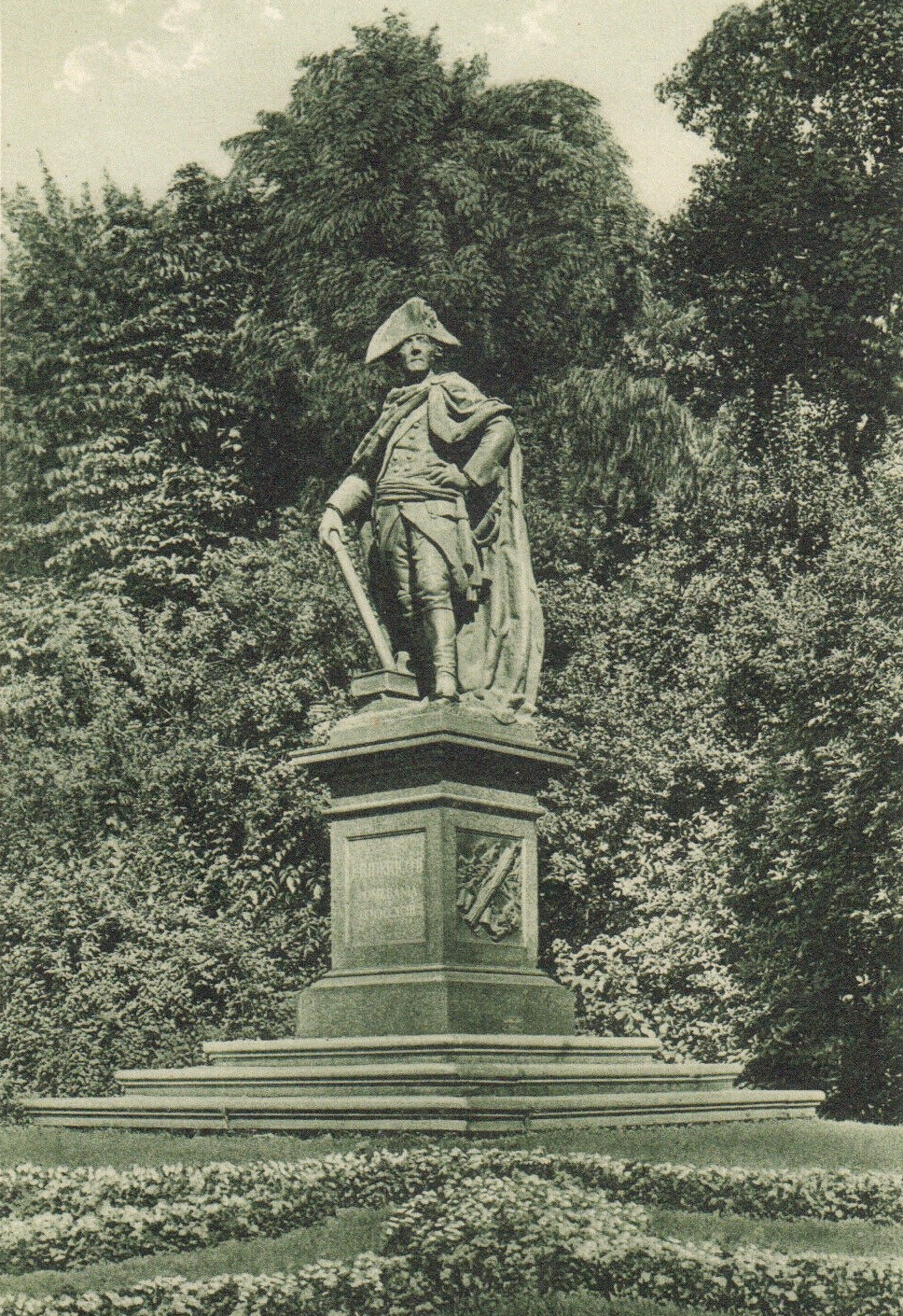
The statue in the 1920s.

The monument commemorating Frederick the Great, the King of Prussia and the Elector of Brandenburg from 1740 to 1786, was proposed in 1791 by Ewald Friedrich von Hertzberg, the Minister of Foreign Affairs of Prussia. It was sculpted by Johann Gottfried Schadow from white marble imported from Carrara, Italy. For his work, he received 6,000 thalers. The statue was unveiled on 10 October 1793, in front of the Palace of the Pomeranian Estates Assembly, at the White Parade Square, later renamed to the King's Square, and currently known as the Polish Soldier Square. It was originally placed on a pedestal made from black marble imported from Silesia, on top of a platform with three steps. It featured reliefs made from white marble, depicting symbols of war, poetry, and music, as well as a Latin inscription which read: "FRIDERICO II POMERANIA CIↃIↃCCXCIII", (Note: Historically, roman numerals did not use M for 1000 and D for 500. In this old-style inscription, CIↃ represents 1000 and IↃ represents 500.) meaning Frederick II, Pomerania, 1793. It was surrounded by a metal fence, with lime trees planted around it. In 1877, due to concerns of a progressing weathering damage, the marble sculpture was moved inside the Palace of the Pomeranian Estates Assembly, with a bronze copy being installed in its place. It was manufactured by Gladenbeck workshop in Berlin, Germany. In 1902, a marble replica of the statue was sculptured by Franz Tübbecke, being commissioned by art historian and museal curator Wilhelm von Bode for the Bode Museum (then known as the Emperor Frederick Museum), where it is displayed to the present day. Another bronze replica of the statue was unveiled in 1975 in front of the Charlottenburg Palace in Berlin.

In 1942, during the Second World War, to protect it from aerial bombings, it was moved to the Wildenbruch Castle in the village of Swobnica. During the transportation, the statue broke into several pieces. The bronze replica displayed at the square has survived the conflict, and is currently displayed at the Pomeranian State Museum in Greifswald in Mecklenburg–West Pomerania, Germany. In 1959, a plaque was commemorating the 25th anniversary of the establishment of the Polish Scouting and Guiding Association branch in the city, was installed at the former pedestal of the monumenta at the Polish Soldier Square.

In 1956, the remains of the marble statue were moved to the storage of the Ducal Castle in Szczecin, and were later handed to the Szczecin National Museum. It remained mostly forgotten until the restorers at the State Plaster Casting Workshop in Berlin borrowed a plaster copy of the statue as a model for restoration. In Berlin, the Schadow Society soon began collecting private donations for the restoration costs, estimated at between 60,000 and 110,000 euros. This made a restoration possible, which was largely carried out by the Wrocław-based sculptor Ryszard Zarycki. The additional parts added to the sculpture were made from the same type of marble imported from Italy, sourced from the same vein of stone as the block Schadow originally used. After its completion, the Bode Museum in Berlin received the statue on a loan from December 2011 to October 2015. It was on display there for the 300th anniversary of Friedrich's birth and the 250th of Schadow's birth. The then Minister of State for Culture, Bernd Neumann, assumed the patronage over the project and issued a security guarantee for the loan on behalf of the government of Germany. At the end of October, the statue was returned to Szczecin, and was placed on the display at the courtyard of the Palace of the Pomeranian Estates Assembly in the custody of the Museum of Regional Traditions, a branch of the Szczecin National Museum.

== Characteristics ==
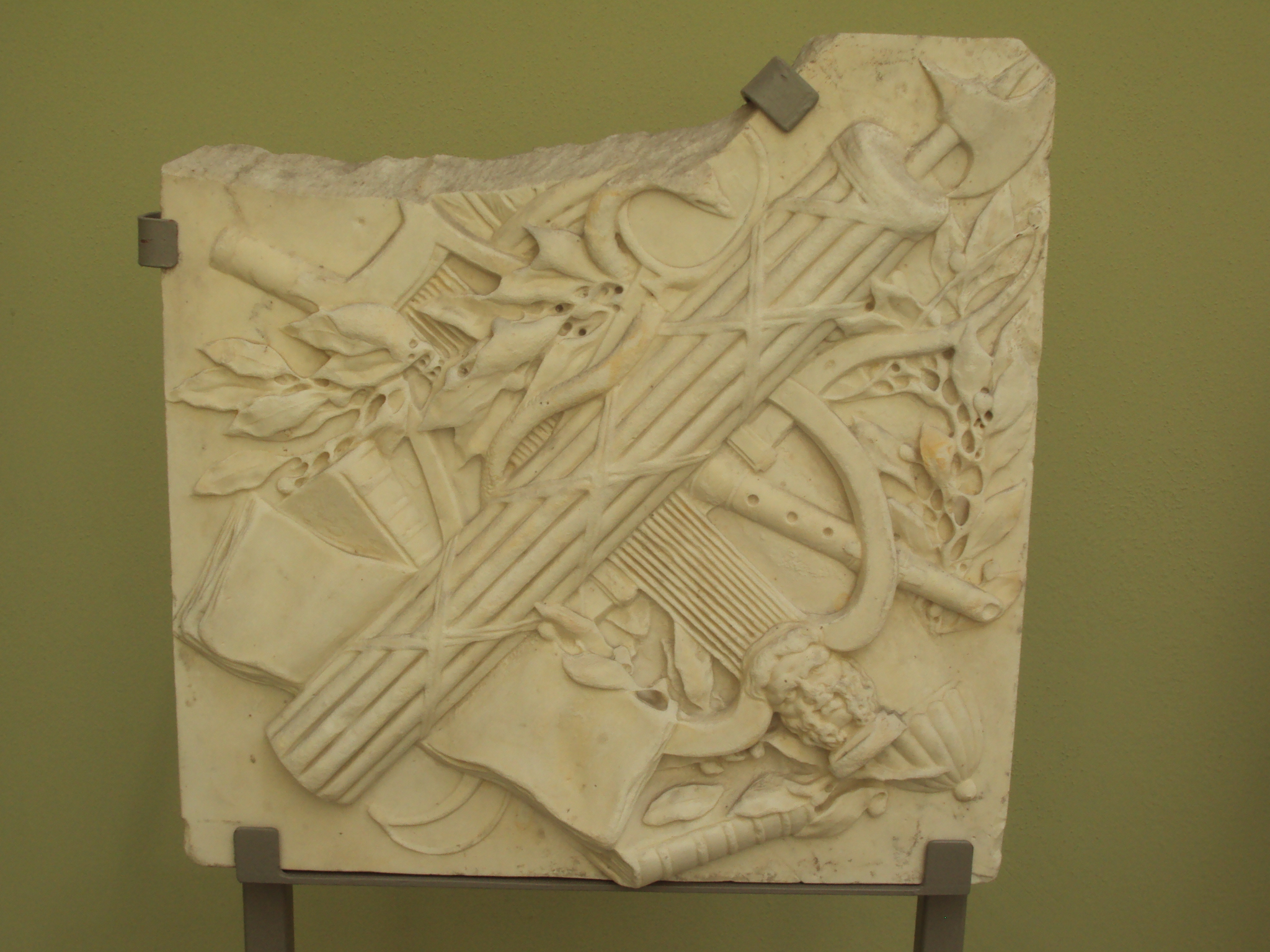
One of the reliefs from the former pedestal.

The statue, made from white marble, depicts Frederick the Great, the King of Prussia and the Elector of Brandenburg from 1740 to 1786, wearing a military uniform, a mantle, a tricorne hat, and riding boots, as well as a pistol and a saber attached to his belt. He holds a baton in his right hand, the bottom of which, he rests on two books stacked on the floor, featuring Latin titles Artes pacis et belli (lit. 'the arts of peace and war') and Corpus Juris Fried (lit. 'the body of law'). The statue measures 2.5 metres (8.2 ft) and weighs 3.5 tones, standing on a square base made of brownish marble.

== See also ==
- Statue of Frederick the Great (Schloss Charlottenburg), the 1975 replica of the sculpture, displayed in Berlin, Germany
