= Paweł Adamowicz Square =

Urban square in Szczecin, Poland

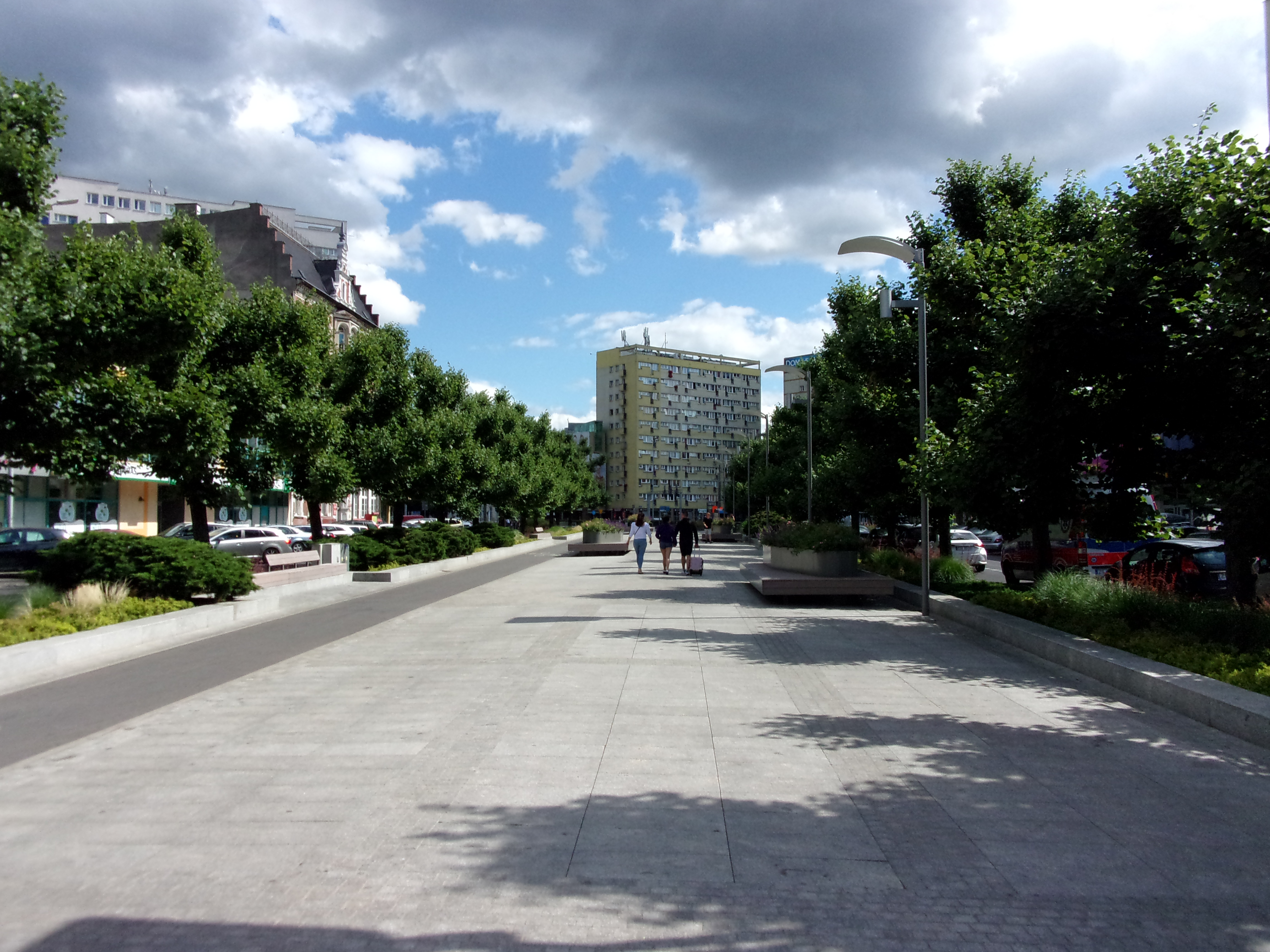
- The Paweł Adamowicz Square in 2021.

- Location within Poland
- Namesake: Paweł Adamowicz
- Type: Urban square
- Location: Szczecin, Poland
- Coordinates: 53°25′44.8″N 14°33′07.8″E
- North: Pope John Paul II Avenue; Aviators Square
- South: Edwarda Bałuki Street; Independence Avenue

Construction
- Completion: 27 September 2019

The Paweł Adamowicz Square (Polish: [ˈpa.vɛw a.daˈmɔ.vit͡ʂ]; Polish: Plac Pawła Adamowicza) is an urban square in Szczecin, Poland, in the neighbourhood of Centrum, within the Downtown district, between Pope John Paul II Avenue, Independence Avenue, and Aviators Square. It was opened in 2019.

== History ==
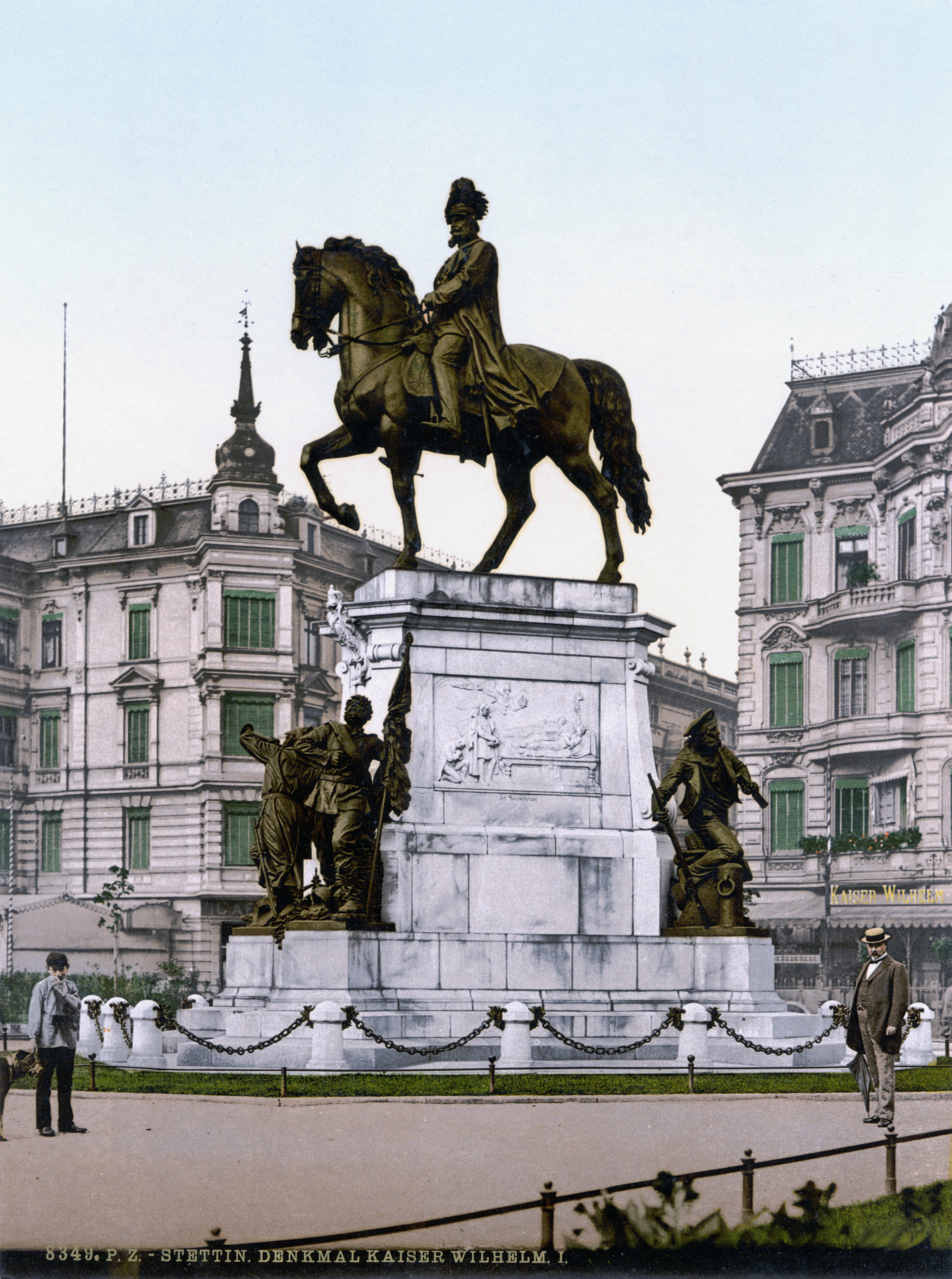
The monument dedicated to William I at the square in 1900.

The current Paweł Adamowicz Square was originally formed as part of the White Parade Square, sometime between 1725 and 1745, by filling the sections of the moat with the rubble from the former city walls. It was renamed to King Square in 1809, and to the Polish Soldier Square in 1945.

In 1874, Emperor William Street (now John Paul II Avenue) was constructed beginning at the square. On 1 November 1894, a monument dedicated to William I, emperor of Germany from 1871 to 1888, was unveiled at the square. It was designed by sculptor Karl Hilgers. It consisted of a bronze statue of the emperor on a horse, placed on a stone pedestal, with bronze sculptures of the soldiers around it.

During World War II, the statues of the soldiers in the monument were taken down to be melted for materials. After the end of the war, on 31 July 1945, the monument was torn down by the Polish inhabitants of the city. The statue was then taken to Denmark and melted. It was used to manufacture a replica of the Prince Józef Antoni Poniatowski Monument in Warsaw, which was destroyed during the war.

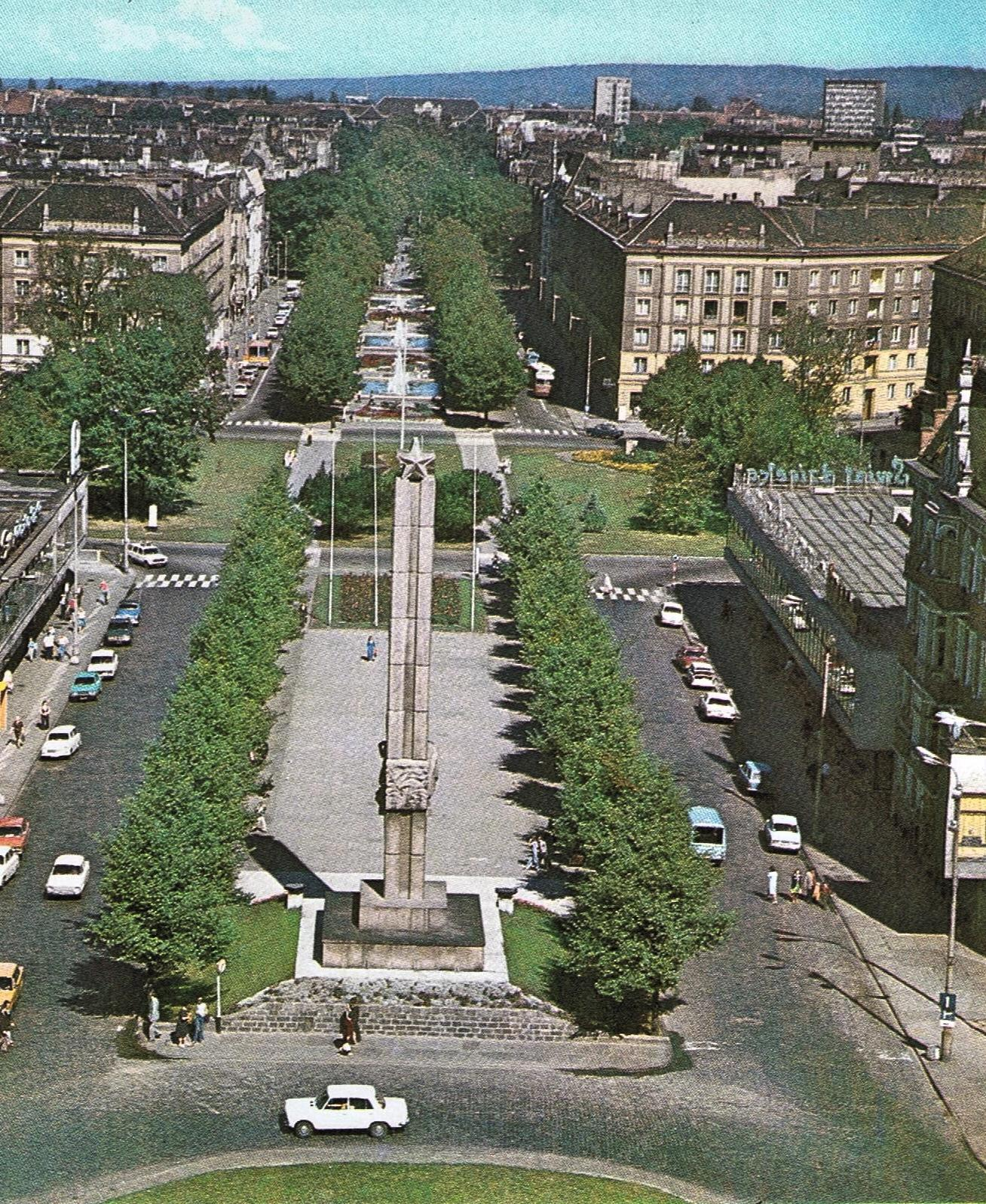
The Monument of Graduate to the Soviet Army at the square in 1978.

In its place, on 26 April 1950, was unveiled the Monument of Graduate to the Soviet Army. It consisted of a 17-metre-tall obelisk made from reinforced concrete covered in sandstone tiles, a sculpture of a soldier and worker holding hands, and a concrete sculpture of a Soviet five-side star on the top. Unveiled on the 5th anniversary of the city being captured by the Red Army in World War II, the monument was dedicated to the Soviet soldiers who fought in the conflict. Following the fall of the Soviet Union and decommunization of Poland, the monument attracted many controversies and calls for its deconstruction, being seen as a symbol of Soviet control of the country. The Soviet star was taken down in 1992, and the entire monument was deconstructed in November 2017.

In 2019, part of the Polish Soldier Square, located between Pope John Paul II Avenue, Independence Avenue, and Aviators Square, which previously included the Monument of Graduate to the Soviet Army, was separated into a new separate Paweł Adamowicz Square. It was named after Paweł Adamowicz, mayor of Gdańsk from 1998 until his assassination in 2019. The square was renovated and rebuilt, and opened on 27 September 2019.

The name proposal caused controversies and disagreement from the Law and Justice party members and its voters, due to allegations of tax evasion against Adamowicz. There were unsuccessful attempts to propose renaming the square after Roman Dmowski, or removing any name whatsoever.

== Characteristics ==
The Paweł Adamowicz Square has the form of a small oblong rectangle, forming a street island within the Pope John Paul II Avenue. To the south it borders the Polish Soldier Square, via the Independence Avenue and Bałuki Street, and to the north, the Aviators Square. It is an avenue with linden trees on its sides, and is surrounded by tenements.
