= Szczecin Meeting Point =

Pavilion in Szczecin, Poland

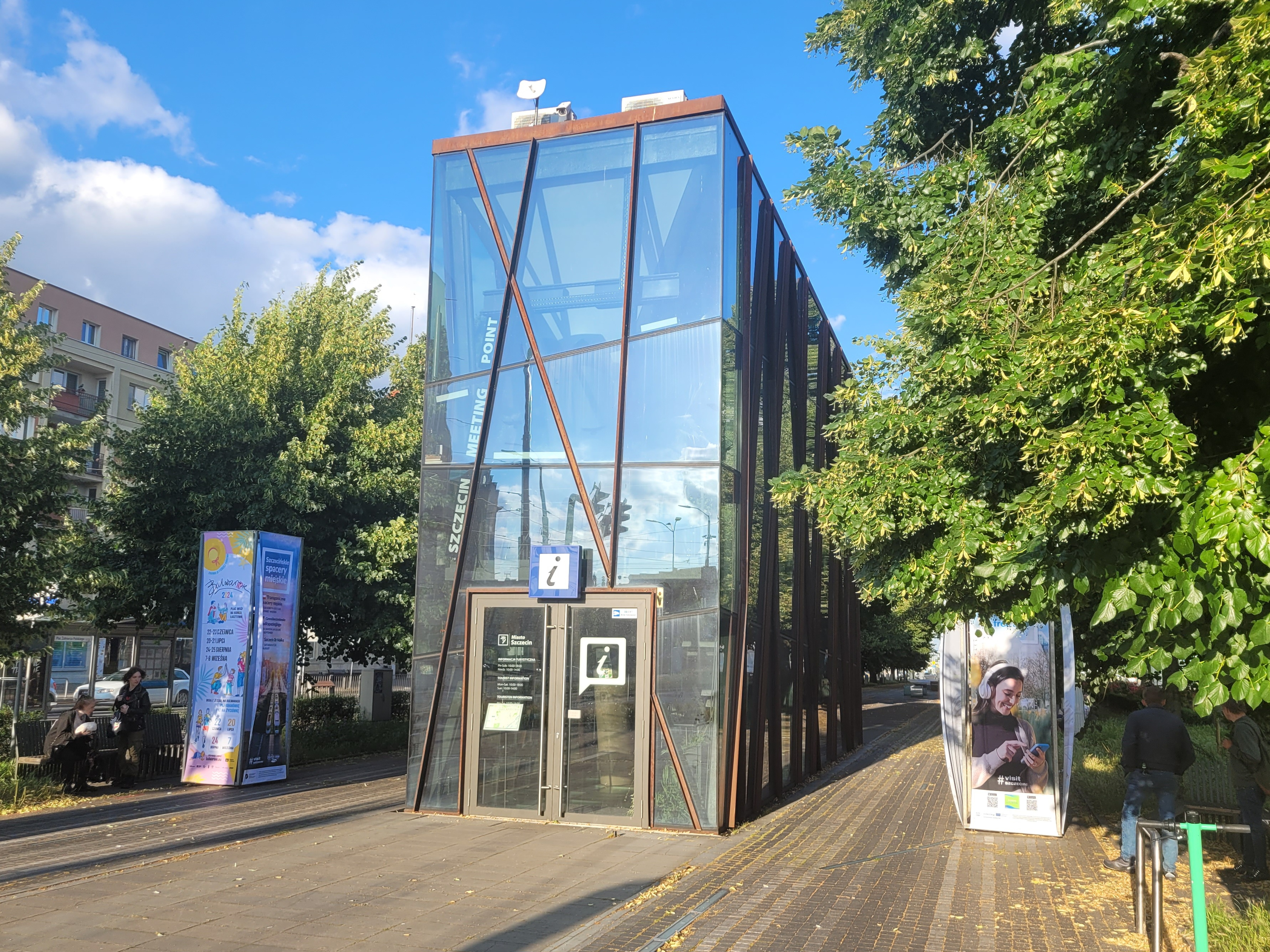
- The Szczecin Meeting Point in 2024.
- Interactive map of the Szczecin Meeting Point area

General information
- Type: Pavilion
- Location: Szczecin, Poland, 20 Polish Soldier Square
- Coordinates: 53°25′42.98″N 14°33′13.43″E
- Construction started: 2011
- Completed: 2012
- Owner: Szczecin Road and Public Transport Administration

Height
- Height: 8.2 m

Technical details
- Floor count: 1 (+1 underground)

Design and construction
- Architecture firm: Studio A4
- Main contractor: Budolux; Erbud

The Szczecin Meeting Point, also colloquially known as the Glass Trap, (Note: Polish: Szklana pułapka) and the Aquarium, (Note: Polish: Akwarium) is a pavilion in Szczecin, Poland, placed at the northern entrance to the Polish Soldier Square. It has a form of a small one-storey-tall cuboid, with structure made out of a weathering steel, façade covered in glass panels, and most of its usable area located underground. It was completed in 2012, and currently houses a visitor centre.

== History ==
The Szczecin Meeting Point was constructed between 2011 and 2012, as part of the overall renovation and redevelopment of the Polish Soldier Square. There were also installed a modernist light installation and sculptures of metal boxes, as well as small and shallow water canals, and a modernist sundial.

The building was designed by architectural firm Studio A4, as a one-storey-tall cuboid, with structure made out of a weathering steel, façade covered in glass panels, and an underground section.

Its construction costed around 3 million Polish złoties, and was finished in September 2012, although the building stood unused for another year. As such it generated unforeseen upkeep costs for the city, which led to local population giving it the nickname Glass Trap (Polish: Szklana pułapka), which persists to the present day. Around the time, due to its shape, it was also referred to as the Aquarium (Polish: Akwarium).

On 18 September 2013, in the building was opened the Szczecin Meeting Point coffeehouse, operated as a branch of the local Columbus Coffee chain. It also operated as a visitor centre, and was a host of numerous cultural events. In early 2016 it was replaced by Cafe Mondo, which operated until July. Since December 2016, it houses the visitor centre operated by Polska Żegluga Szczecińska.

== Characteristics ==
The building is a one-storey-tall cuboid, with structure made out of a weathering steel, façade covered in glass panels, and an underground section. It has the width of 3.8 m, and the height of 8.2 m, and is placed at the northern entrance to the Polish Soldier Square. Most of the usable area of the building is located underground. It is placed at the northern entrance to the Polish Soldier Square, near the intersection of Independence Avenue, Emancipation Avenue, and Pope John Paul II Avenue.
