= Szczecin water pumps =

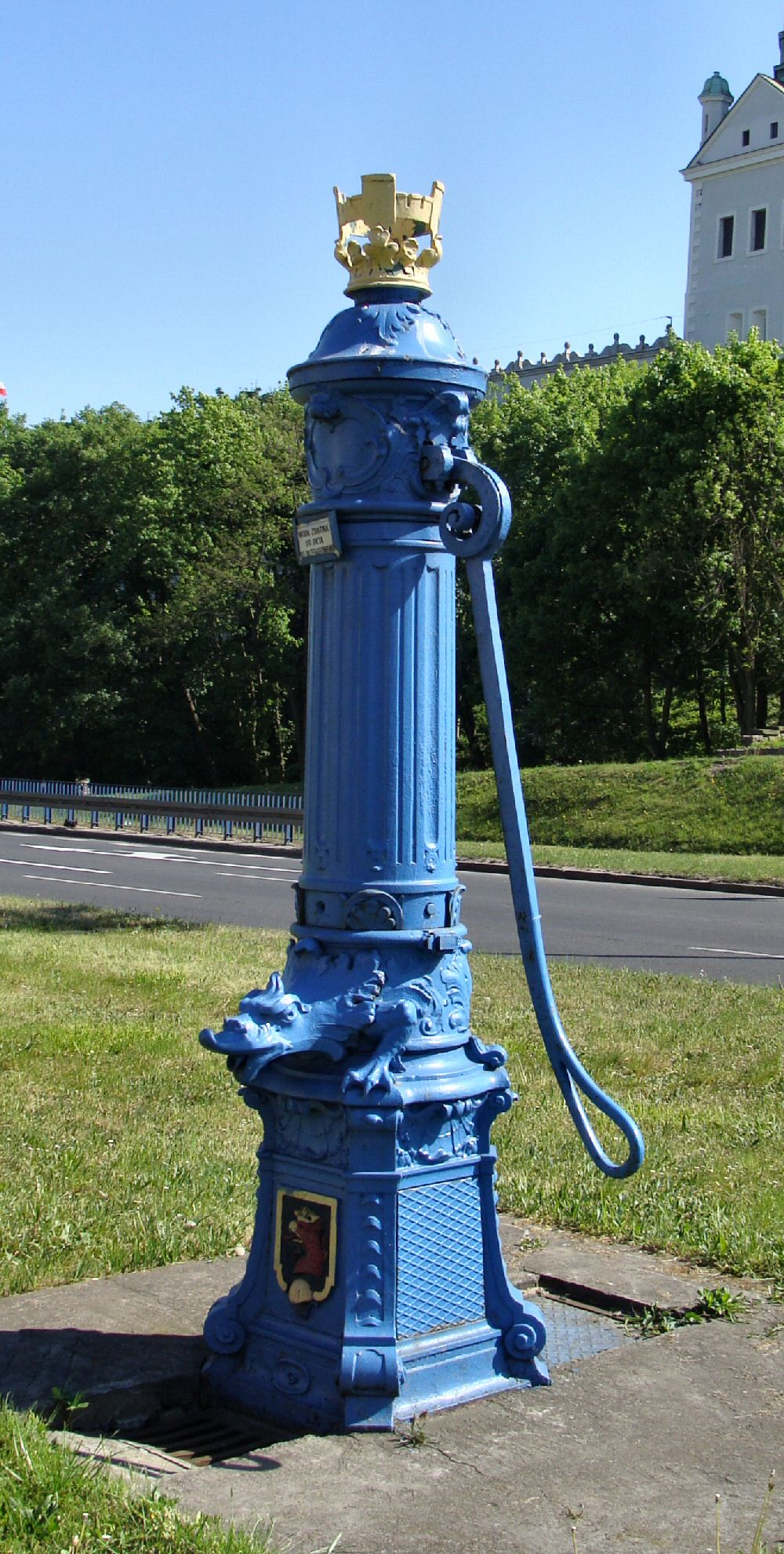
The pump near the Castle Way, Szczecin in 2009.

The Szczecin water pumps, (Note: Polish: Szczecińskie pompy wodne; German: Stettiner Wasserpumpen) colloquially known as Berliners, (Note: Polish: berlinki, singular: berlinka) are historic water pumps in Szczecin, Poland, that are a characteristic object of the city. There were 70 pumps originally made between 1865 and 1895, with 28 surviving to this day, 27 of which hold the status of cultural property.

== History ==
The pumps were manufactured between 1865 and 1895, in the F. Poepck Water Pump factories located in Szczecin and Chojna. Originally, there were around 70 pumps made, of which 28 survive to this day. Originally, the pumps were painted in blue with colorful details depicting the city coat of arms. After World War 2, they were repainted to a green colour. In the first years after the war, the pumps were very useful for the city inhabitants as the water supply network remained not fully functional at the time. At that time, the elements from damaged pumps were relocated to the working ones. At the beginning of the 21st century, the pumps were repainted to their original colours.

In 2000, thanks to a city conservator-restorer, Małgorzata Gwiazdowska, 27 of the pumps were listed as cultural property. By the 2010s, all pumps required restoration to their original state, as they were damaged, and decorative details of the pumps had been stolen over the years. Polcast foundry, in cooperation with West Pomeranian University of Technology, was tasked by the Szczecin Department of Water Supply and Sewage to prepare the copies of missing decorative elements. Such copies were made using both traditional methods used in the original manufacturing and modern technologies, such as computer modeling. In 2013, the department was given 25,000 Polish złoty from the city for the restoration efforts.

Many of the pumps no longer work, due to the lowering of the groundwater levels in the 2000s.

Currently, the pumps are a characteristic object of the city, and are popular among tourists.

== Description ==
The pumps are made of iron and have a form of almost 3-metre-tall (9.8 ft.) column with diameter of 36 cm (14.2 in) and base in the shape of the square with the side dimensions of 61 cm (24 in). The water is pumped with a hand lever and discharged from an opening in a form of a sculpture of a dragon. They are painted in a blue colour with a yellow crown placed at the top and a city coat of arms at the bottom. They were originally painted as such in the 19th century, and after World War 2, were repainted to green. At the beginning of the 21st century, the pumps were repainted to their original colours.

The pumps are independent from the city water supply network, instructed using the ground water. Many of them do not work anymore, due to the lowering of the groundwater levels in the 2000s. They are under the administration and maintenance of the Szczecin Department of Water Supply and Sewage.

The pumps are colloquially known as Berliners, as they are the same model as the historical water pumps in the city of Berlin, Germany.

There are currently 28 of them in the city, located at:

- intersection of Piątego Lipca Street and Noakowskiego Street;
- Bazarowa Street;
- Concord Square;
- intersection of Cieszkowskiego Street and Bojki Street;
- intersection of Grodzka Street and Mariacka Street;
- intersection of Tkacka Street and Grodzka Street;
- intersection of Heleny Street and Karpińskiego Street;
- intersection of Pope John Paul II Avenue and Mazurska Street;
- intersection of Kaszubska Street and Narutowicza Street;
- intersection of Kopernika Street and Krzywoustego Street;
- intersection of Królowej Jadwigi Street and Krzywoustego Street;
- intersection of Bogusława X Street and Łokietka Street;
- 8 Malczewskiego Street in Strefan Żeromski Park;
- 55 Małopolska Street;
- intersection of Monte Cassino Street and Jagiellońska Street;
- Mściwoja Street at the Hay Market Square;
- Independence Avenue;
- intersection of Bałuki Street and Św. Wojciecha Street at Anders Park
- Grey Ranks Square;
- Grunwald Square;
- Św. Piotra i Pawła Street near the Castle Way;
- Zawisza the Black Square;
- Polish Soldier Square;
- intersection of Potulicka Street and Drzymały Street;
- intersection of Wyzwolenia Avenue and Felczaka Street;
- intersection of Odzieżowa Street and Wyzwolenia Avenue;
- intersection of Wyzwolenia Avenue and Rayskiego Street;
- and an intersection of Żupańskiego Street and Niemierzyńska Street.
