= Wilhelm I Memorial (Szczecin) =

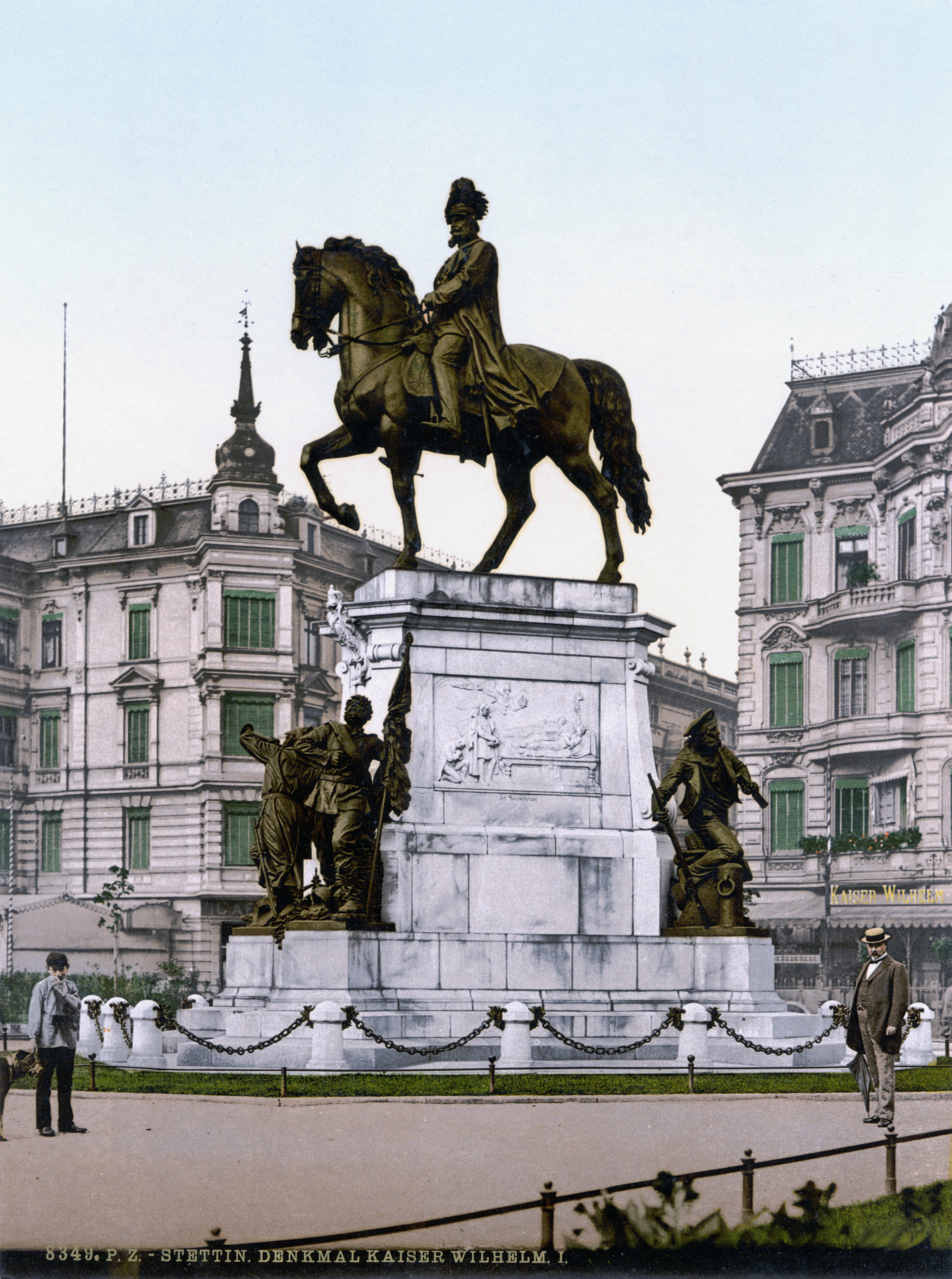
- The monument in 1900.
- Interactive map of Wilhelm I Memorial
- Location: Polish Soldier Square, Szczecin, Poland
- Coordinates: 53°25′43.4″N 14°33′10.6″E
- Designer: Karl Hilgers
- Type: Equestrian statue
- Material: Bronze, stone
- Opening date: 1 November 1894
- Dedicated to: Wilhelm I
- Dismantled date: 31 July 1945

The Wilhelm I Memorial (German: Wilhelmsdenkmal; Polish: Pomnik Wilhelma I) was a monument in Szczecin, Poland, in form of an equestrian statue of Wilhelm I, emperor of Germany from 1871 to 1888. It was designed by sculptor Karl Hilgers and unveiled on 1 November 1894 at the King's Square (now Polish Soldier Square). The monument was dismantled on 31 July 1945.

== History ==
The Wilhelm I Memorial as seen from the King's Square (now Polish Soldier Square).

On 1 November 1894, at the King's Square (now known as the Polish Soldier Square) the monument dedicated to Wilhelm I, emperor of Germany from 1871 to 1888, was unveiled. It was designed by sculptor Karl Hilgers and manufactured by Berlin-based company Schäffer und Walker. The monument was funded from the donations from city inhabitants. It consisted of a bronze statue of the emperor on a horse, placed on a stone pedestal, with bronze sculptures of the soldiers around it.

During World War II, the statues of the soldiers in the Wilhelm I Memorial were taken down to be melted for materials. Following the end of the conflict, on 31 July 1945, the monument was torn down by the Polish inhabitants of the city. The statue was then taken to Denmark and melted. It was used to manufacture a replica of the Prince Józef Antoni Poniatowski Monument in Warsaw, which was destroyed during the war.

In its place, on 26 April 1950, was unveiled the Monument of Graduate to the Soviet Army. It was deconstructed in November 2017.

== Characteristics ==
The monument was placed at the northern end of the King Square (now Polish Soldier Square) and at the beginning of Emperor William Street (now John Paul II Avenue). It included a bronze statue of the emperor Wilhelm I on a horse, wearing a military uniform and a helmet with a war bonnet. It was placed on a white stone Gothic Revival pedestal, with depictions of historical scenes on its walls. Around its corners were placed bronze statues of soldiers.
