= Pomeranian Griffin (sculpture) =

Sculpture in Szczecin, Poland

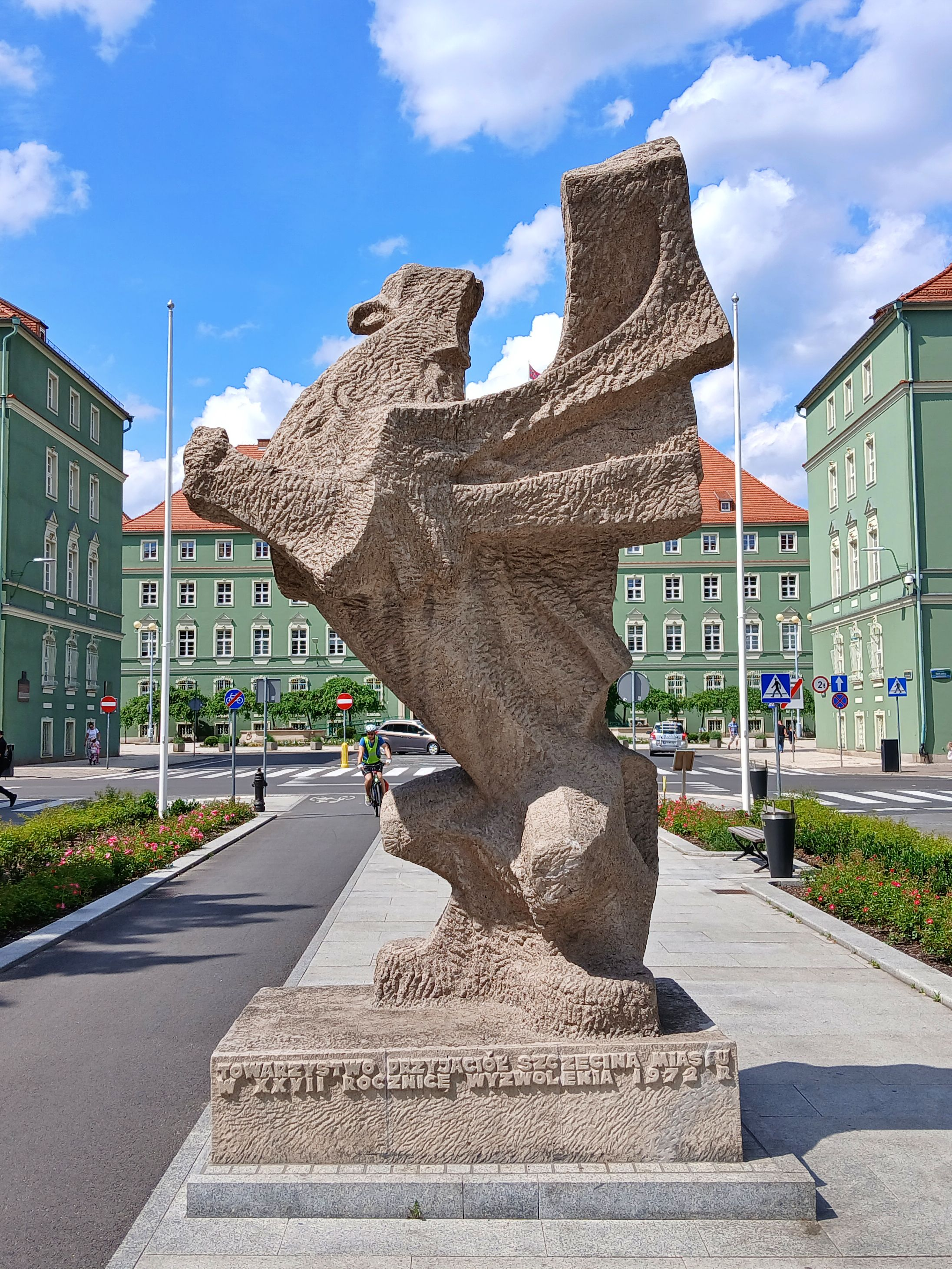
- The sculpture in 2024.
- Interactive map of Pomeranian Griffin
- Location: Pope John Paul II Avenue, Downtown-North, Szczecin, Poland
- Coordinates: 53°26′14.42″N 14°32′35.17″E
- Designer: Leonia Chmielnik (designer and sculptor); Anna Paszkiewicz-Sawicka (sculptor)
- Type: Statue
- Material: Artificial stone
- Height: 4.45 m (total); 4 m (statue)
- Opening date: 26 April 1972

Pomeranian Griffin (Polish: Gryf Pomorski), also known as the statue of Griffin (Polish: Pomnik Gryfa), is an artificial stone sculpture in Szczecin, Poland, within the neighbourhood of Downtown-North within the Downtown district. It is placed in front of the Szczecin City Hall, on Pope John Paul II Avenue, near the intersection with Wacław Feldczak Street. The statue depicts a griffin, a legendary creature with the body, tail, and back legs of a lion, and the head and wings of an eagle with its talons on the front legs. It is the symbol of the city and the region of Western Pomerania, being present in their coat of arms. The sculpture was designed by Leonia Chmielnik, and sculptured by her together with Anna Paszkiewicz-Sawicka. It was unveiled on 26 April 1972, on the 27th anniversary of Szczecin being captured by the Red Army of the Soviet Union during the Second World War.

== History ==
The sculpture was designed by Leonia Chmielnik in 1971, and sculptured by her together with Anna Paszkiewicz-Sawicka in 1972, at the courtyard of the Ducal Castle in Szczecin. It was funded by the Friends of Szczecin Society. The sculpture was placed on Pope John Paul II Avenue, in front of the Szczecin City Hall. It was unveiled on 26 April 1972, on the 27th anniversary of the city being captured by the Red Army of the Soviet Union during the Second World War. It was commemorated with an inscription at the base of the monument, which, when translated, reads: "The Friends of Szczecin Society to the city, in the 27th anniversary of the emancipation; 1972". Over the years, the base of the monument was covered with leafage and the inscription was forgotten by the general public. It was brough back to public attention in 2021, after the plants around the sculpture were cut down, sparking a controversy, being viewed as part of the propaganda of the People's Republic of Poland and the Soviet Union, to justify Polish claim to the city after the war. It led to calls for the removal of the inscription, however, it was decided to keep it to preserve the original historical form of the sculpture.

On 5 April 2022, artists Łukasz Surowiec and Monika Szpener wrapped the sculpture in a tarpaulin, in an act of solidarity with Ukraine over the Russo-Ukrainian war. It was done to evoke outdoor sculptures being covered in similar manner in Ukraine to protect them from destruction during the conflict. The artist envisioned the monument to stay in such form until the end of the war. However, a group of right-wing protesters took it off on 10 April.

== Characteristics ==
The sculpture is placed on Pope John Paul II Avenue, in front of the Szczecin City Hall, near the intersection with Wacław Feldczak Street. It is made from an artificial stone, has a form of a statue of a griffin, a legendary creature with the body, tail, and back legs of a lion, and the head and wings of an eagle with its talons on the front legs. It is the symbol of the city and the region of Western Pomerania, being present in their coat of arms. It is depicted standing on slightly bent hind legs, with the front legs raised to chest height, and its wings being raised. The statue has the height of 4 m. It stands on a pedestal with the height of 45 cm, and has a base in the shape of a rectangle. The sculpture is placed on Pope John Paul II Avenue, in front of the Szczecin City Hall, near the intersection with Wacław Feldczak Street. In total, the sculpture measures 445 cm in height. The pedestal features an inscription in Polish, which reads:

Polish inscription

Towarzystwo Przyjaciół Szczecina miastu
W XXVII rocznicę wyzwolenia
1972 r.

Translation:
English translation

The Friends of Szczecin Society to the city.
In the 27th anniversary of the emancipation.
1972.
