= Polish Soldier Square =

Urban square in Szczecin, Poland

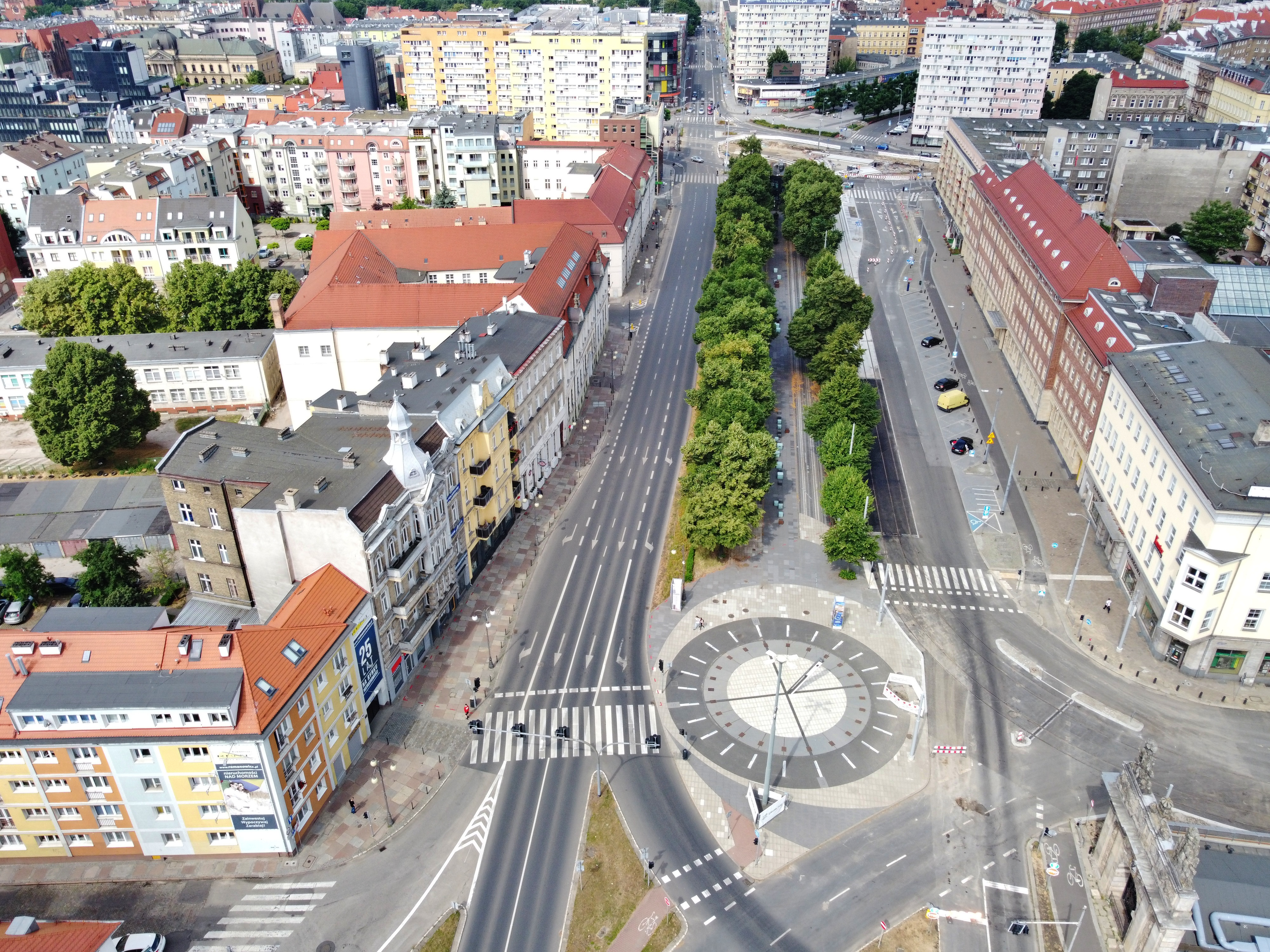
- The Polish Soldier Square in 2021.

- Location within Poland
- Former names: White Parade Square (1725–1809); King's Square (1809–1945); Theatre Square (1945–1946)
- Type: Urban square
- Location: Szczecin, Poland
- Coordinates: 53°25′42.2″N 14°33′17.6″E
- East: Castle Way; Jana Matejki Street
- South: Tkacka Street; Staromłyńska Street
- West: Edmunda Bałuki Street; Emancipation Avenue; Independence Avenue; Pope John Paul II Avenue

Construction
- Completion: 1725

The Polish Soldier Square, (Note: Polish: Plac Żołnierza Polskiego) also commonly referred to as the Flower Avenue, (Note: Polish: Aleja Kwiatowa; German: Blumenallee) is an urban square in Szczecin, Poland, located at the bounry of neighbourhoods of Centrum and Old Town, within the Downtown district. To the north and south of the square are placed roads, which intersect with Independence Avenue, Emancipation Avenue, Pope John Paul II Avenue, and Bałuki Street to the west, and with Jana Matejki Street and Castle Way to the east. The square was established in 1725, and was formerly known as the White Parade Square (Note: German: Weiße Paradeplatz; Polish: Biały Plac Parad) until 1809, and later as the King's Square (Note: German: Königsplatz; Polish: Plac Królewski) until 1945.

== History ==
The formation of the square began in 1725, and continued for around twenty years, during which sections of the moat were filled in with the rubble from the former city walls. At first, its eastern portion was the location of military training exercises. Numerous parades and events began to be held at the square, and it came to be known as the White Parade Square (German: Weiße Paradeplatz; Polish: Biały Plac Parad).

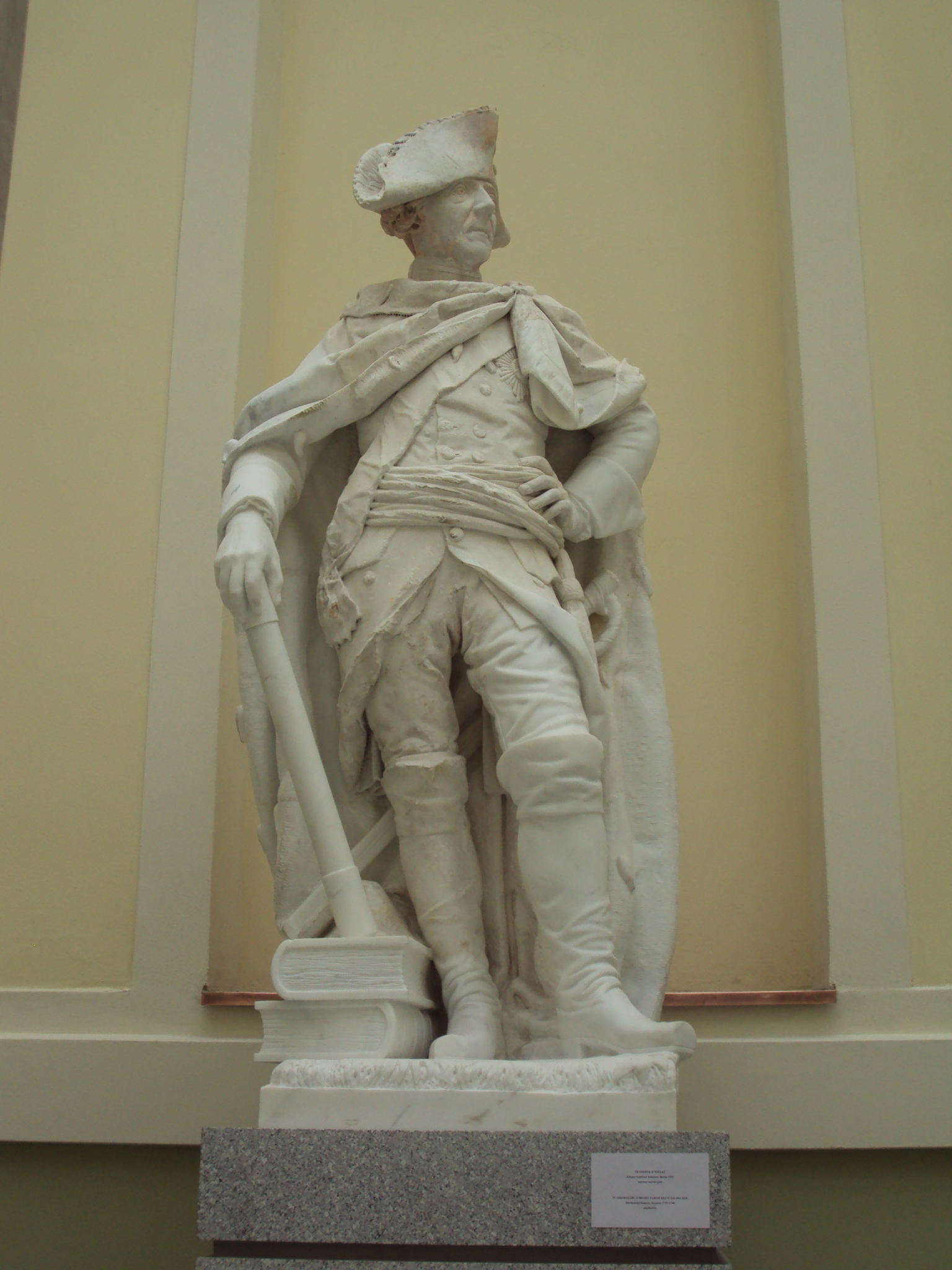
The statue of Frederick the Great, which stood at the square from 1793 to 1877. Currently in the National Museum in Szczecin.

On 10 October 1793, a statue of Frederick the Great, the King of Prussia and Elector of Brandenburg from 1740 to 1786, was unveiled at the square. It was designed by Johann Gottfried Schadow and made from marble. In 1877, as the statue begun deteriorating due to atmospheric damage, it was relocated inside, to the nearby Palace of the Pomeranian Estates Assembly. In its place at the square was placed a bronze replica.

At the turn of 19th century, alongside the square were constructed representative tenements, including Palace of the Heads, Palace of the Pomeranian Estates Assembly, and the Grey Castle. In 1806, it was renamed to the King's Square (German: Königsplatz; Polish: Plac Królewski).

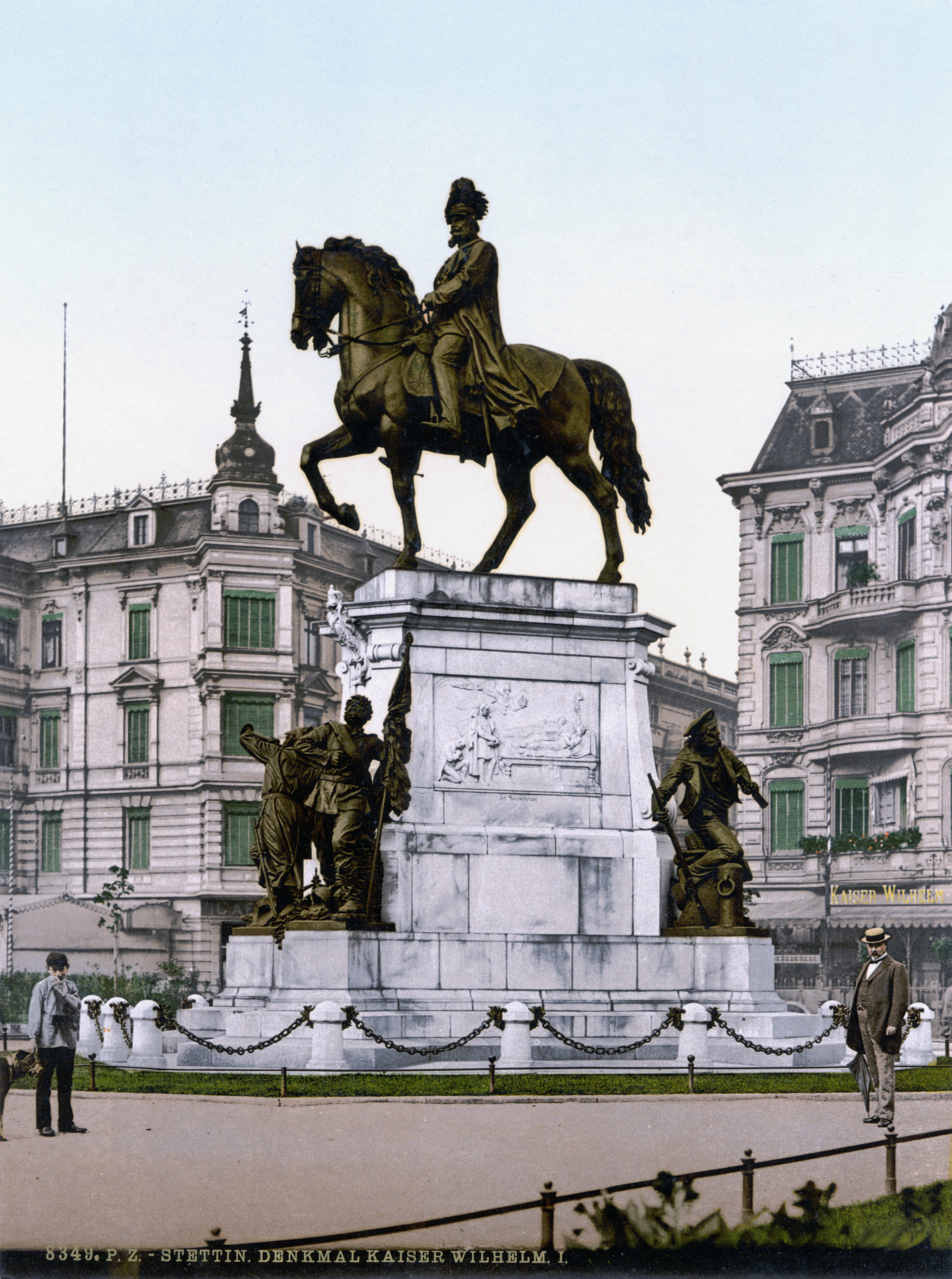
The monument dedicated to William I at the square in 1900.

On 17 October 1848, a monument of Frederick William III of Prussia, the emperor King of Prussia and Elector of Brandenburg from 1797 to 1840, was unveiled there. It was made by Friedrich Drake, and did not remain to the present day. In 1949 the City Theatre opened next to the square. It was later greatly expanded between 1899 and 1904, and eventually deconstructed in 1954.

On 1 November 1894, a monument dedicated to William I, emperor of Germany from 1871 to 1888, was unveiled at the square. It was designed by sculptor Karl Hilgers. It consisted of a bronze statue of the emperor on a horse, placed on a stone pedestal, with bronze sculptures of the soldiers around it.

The square was bombed in 1944 during World War II, during which nearby Grey Castle tenement was destroyed. In 1945, it was renamed to the Theatre Square (Polish: Plac Teatralny; German: Theater Platz). In May 1946, it was again renamed to the Polish Soldier Square, in honour of the Victory Day. Despite that, the former name remained in some official use until 1950.

During the conflict, the statues of the soldiers in the statue of William I were taken down to be melted for materials. After the end of the war, on 31 July 1945, the monument was torn down by the Polish inhabitants of the city. The statue was then taken to Denmark and melted. It was used to manufacture the replica of the Prince Józef Antoni Poniatowski Monument in Warsaw, which was destroyed during the war.

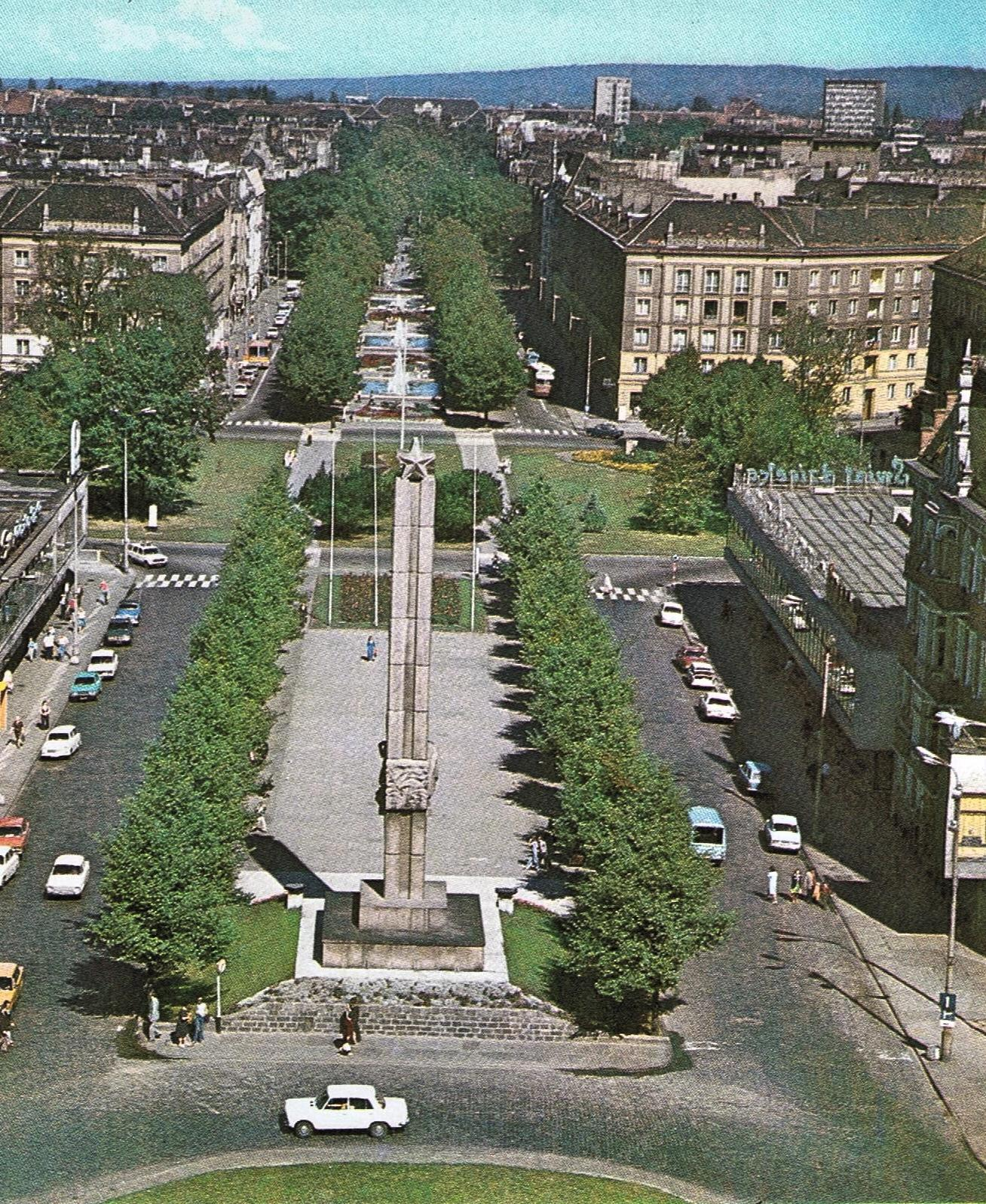
The Monument of Graduate to the Soviet Army at the square in 1978.

In its place, on 26 April 1950, was unveiled the Monument of Graduate to the Soviet Army. It consisted of a 17-metre-tall obelisk made from reinforced concrete covered in sandstone tiles, a sculpture of a soldier and worker holding hands, and a concrete sculpture of a Soviet five-side star on the top. Unveiled on the 5th anniversary of the city being captured by the Red Army in World War II, the monument was dedicated to the Soviet soldiers who fought in the conflict. Following the fall of the Soviet Union, and decommunization of Poland, the monument attracted many controversies and calls for its deconstruction, being seen as the symbol of Soviet control of the country. The Soviet star was taken down in 1992, and the entire monument was deconstructed in November 2017.

In 1959, a plaque was placed at the square commemorating the 25th anniversary of the establishment of the Polish scouting and guiding organization structures in the city. It was installed in the former location of the statue of Frederick the Great.

Until 2011, the square hosted a flower market, which led to it being nicknamed as the Flower Avenue to the present day.

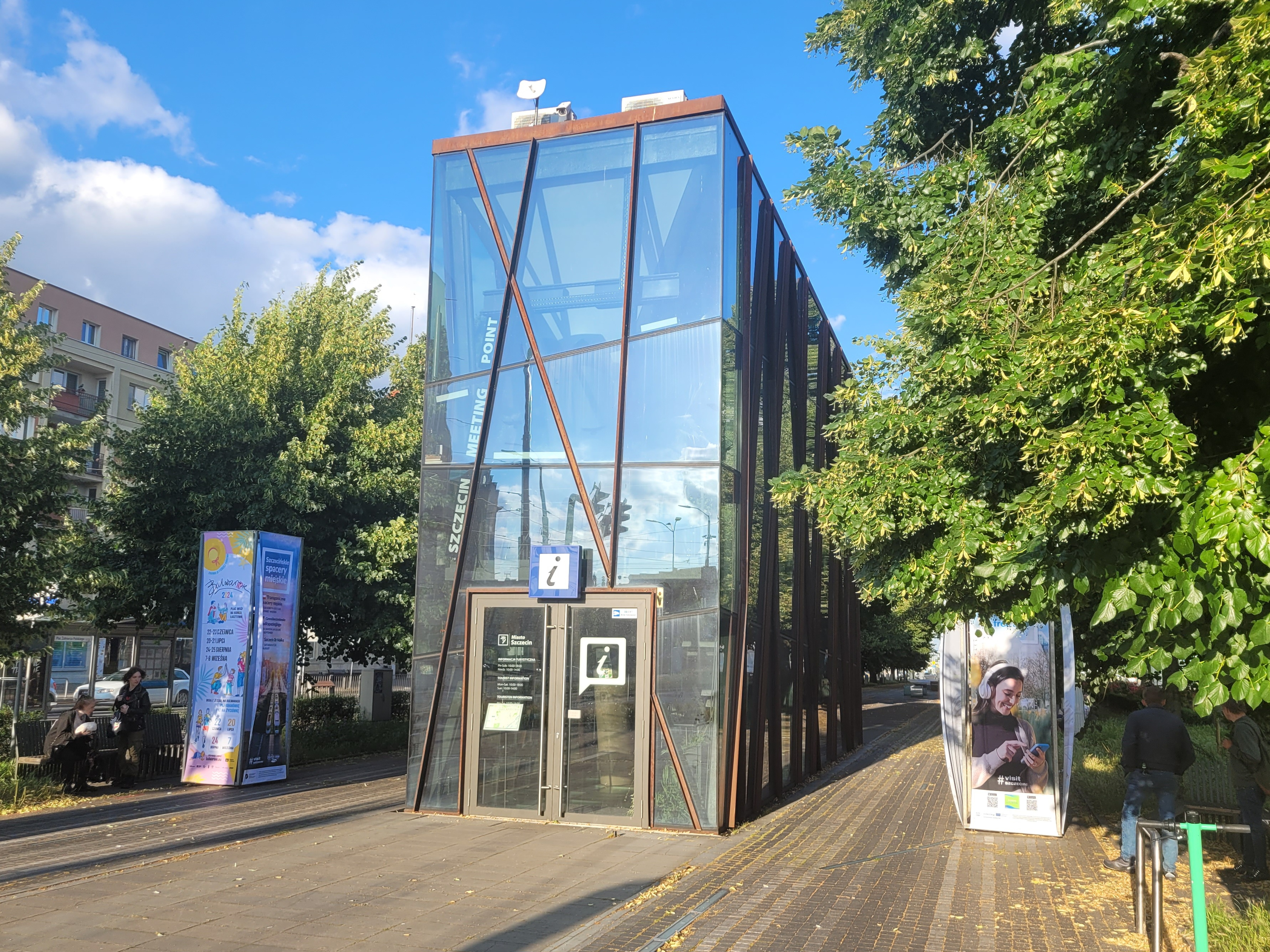
The Szczecin Meeting Point, a pavilion at the square, opened in 2012. Photography made in 2024.

The Polish Soldier Square was renovated and rebuilt between 2011 and 2012. At its eastern end, at the pavement was installed a large sundial. The main avenue was decorated with modernist light installation and sculptures of metal boxes, as well as small and shallow water canals. At its western end was constructed a pavilion known as the Szczecin Meeting Point. It has a form of a one-storey-tall cuboid, with structure made out of a weathering steel, façade covered in glass panels, and most of its usable area located underground. Originally it hosted a coffeehouse, and since 2016, it is a visitor centre.

In 2019, part of the square, located between Pope John Paul II, Independence Avenue, and Aviators Square, which previously included the Monument of Graduate to the Soviet Army, was separated into a new separate Paweł Adamowicz Square. It was named after Paweł Adamowicz, mayor of Gdańsk from 1998 until his assassination in 2019. The square was renovated and rebuilt, and opened on 27 September 2019.

== Characteristics ==
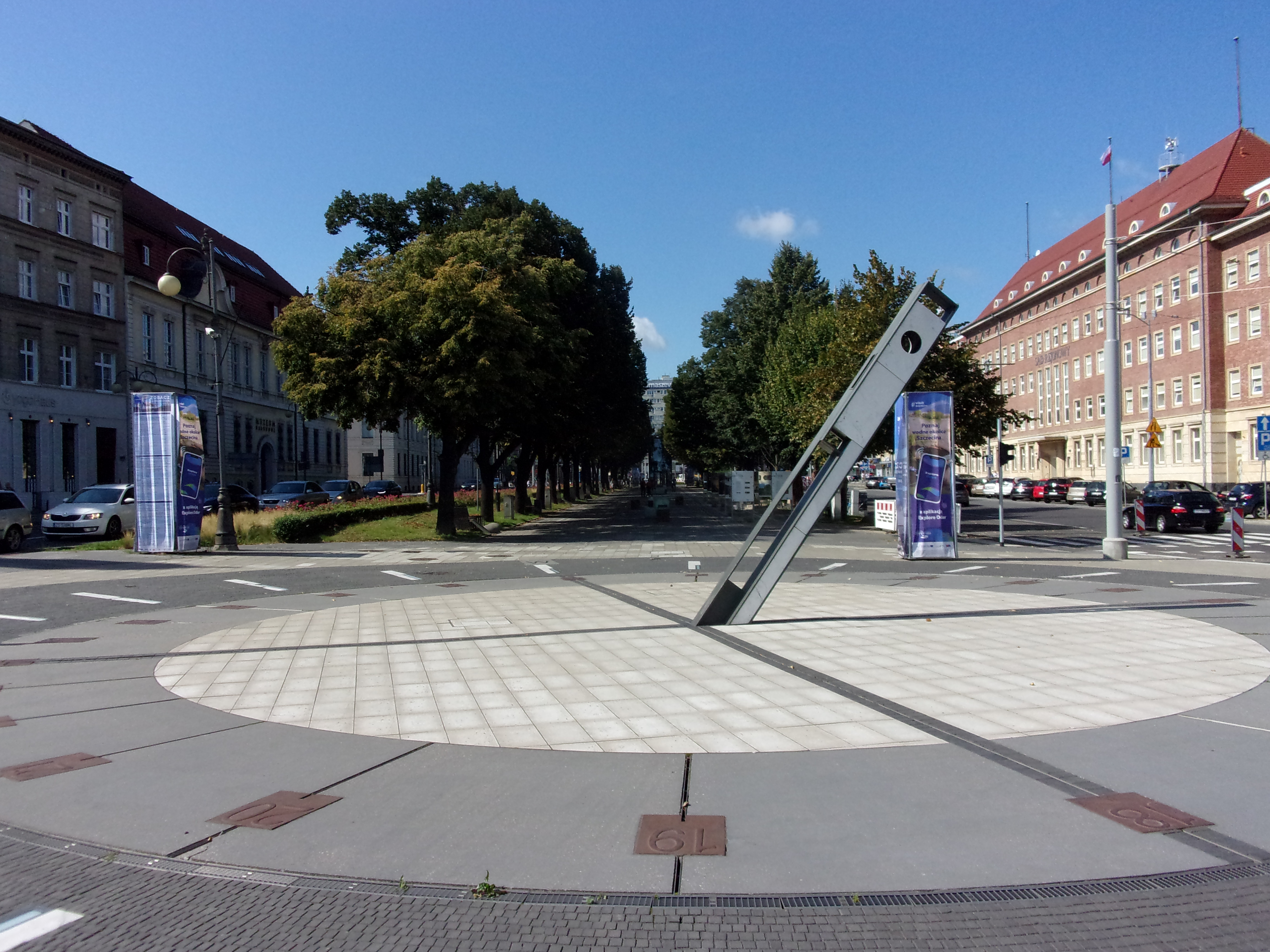
The sundial at the Polish Soldier Square in 2021.

The Polish Soldier Square has the form of an oblong rectangle avenue, with rows of linden trees on its sides. At its eastern end, in the pavement is installed a large sundial. The main avenue is decorated with modernist light installation and sculptures of metal boxes, as well as small and shallow water canals. At its western end is located a pavilion known as the Szczecin Meeting Point. It has a form of a one-storey-tall cuboid, with structure made out of a weathering steel, façade covered in glass panels, and most of its usable area located underground. Currently, it functions as a visitor centre.

To the north and south of the square are placed roads, which intersect with Independence Avenue, Emancipation Avenue, Pope John Paul II Avenue, and Bałuki Street to the west, and with Jana Matejki Street and Castle Way to the east. To the south it also connects with Tkacka Street and Staromłyńska Street. To the west is located the Paweł Adamowicz Square, and to the northeast, the Prussian Homage Square.

The square also includes a plaque commemorating the 25th anniversary of the establishment of the Polish scouting and guiding organization structures in the city, and one of the historical 19th-century city water pumps.

The square is surrounded by tenement buildings, including the Palace of the Heads and the Palace of the Pomeranian Estates Assembly, which house divisions of the National Museum in Szczecin.
