= Palace of the Heads =

Palace in Szczecin, Poland

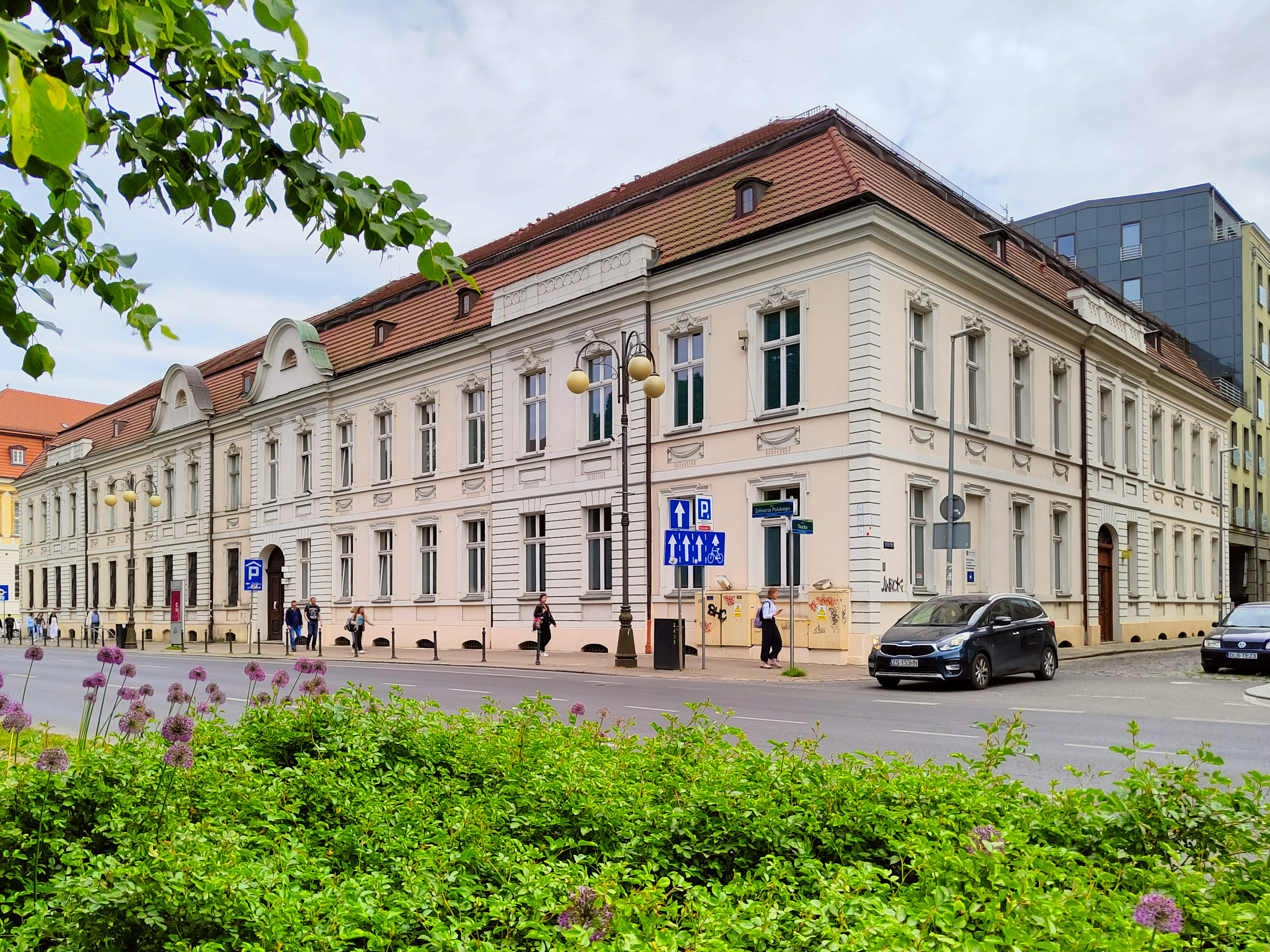
- The building in 2023, as seen from the Polish Soldier Square.
- Interactive map of the Palace of the Heads area

General information
- Type: Palace
- Architectural style: Neoclassical
- Location: Szczecin, Poland, 1 Staromłyńska Street / 2 Polish Soldier Square
- Coordinates: 53°25′41.68″N 14°33′13.80″E
- Completed: 18th century

The Palace of the Heads (Polish: Pałac pod Głowami; German: Palast unter den Köpfen) is a historical neoclassical building in Szczecin, Poland, located at 1 Staromłyńska Street and 2 Polish Soldier Square, in the Old Town neighbourhood. It consists of two conjoined tenements, dating to the 18th century. Currently it houses the Museum of Contemporary Art, a division of the National Museum in Szczecin, and the cultural centre of Dom Kultury 13 Muz.

== History ==
The Palace of the Heads was originally developed at the end of the 18th century, as two tenements, which were conjoined together in 1889. Since then, until the end of the Second World War, it was used by the military administration, including being the headquarters of the garrison commander of the city fortifications.

It was damaged during the conflict, and restored in 1958. Prior to the conflict, its façade featured sculptures of heads of nine Greek mythological figures. During the reconstruction, sculptor Sławomir Lewiński replaced them with heads of local artists. By doing so, he wanted to emphasise young and developing Polish presence in the city. The building itself was donated to house cultural institutions.

In May 1948, the right wing of the building became headquarters of the cultural institution of Dom Kultury 13 Muz. In the 1970s, in its left wing was opened the Museum of Contemporary Art, a division of the National Museum in Szczecin.

== Characteristics ==
The Palace of the Heads consists of two conjoined building. It has a neoclassical façade, which includes nine sculptures by Sławomir Lewiński, depicting heads of people linked to the local culture institutions, and mounted above the windows. They are: Władysław Filipowiak, Zofia Krzymuska-Fafius, Stefan Kwilecki, Jan Papuga, Bohdan Skłodowski, Janina Kosińska-Brzozowska, Józef Barecki, Antoni Huebner, and Józef Gruda. Some of the rooms maintain original moulding decorations.

The left wing houses the Museum of Contemporary Art, a division of the National Museum in Szczecin, while the right wing, the cultural centre of Dom Kultury 13 Muz.

== Gallery ==
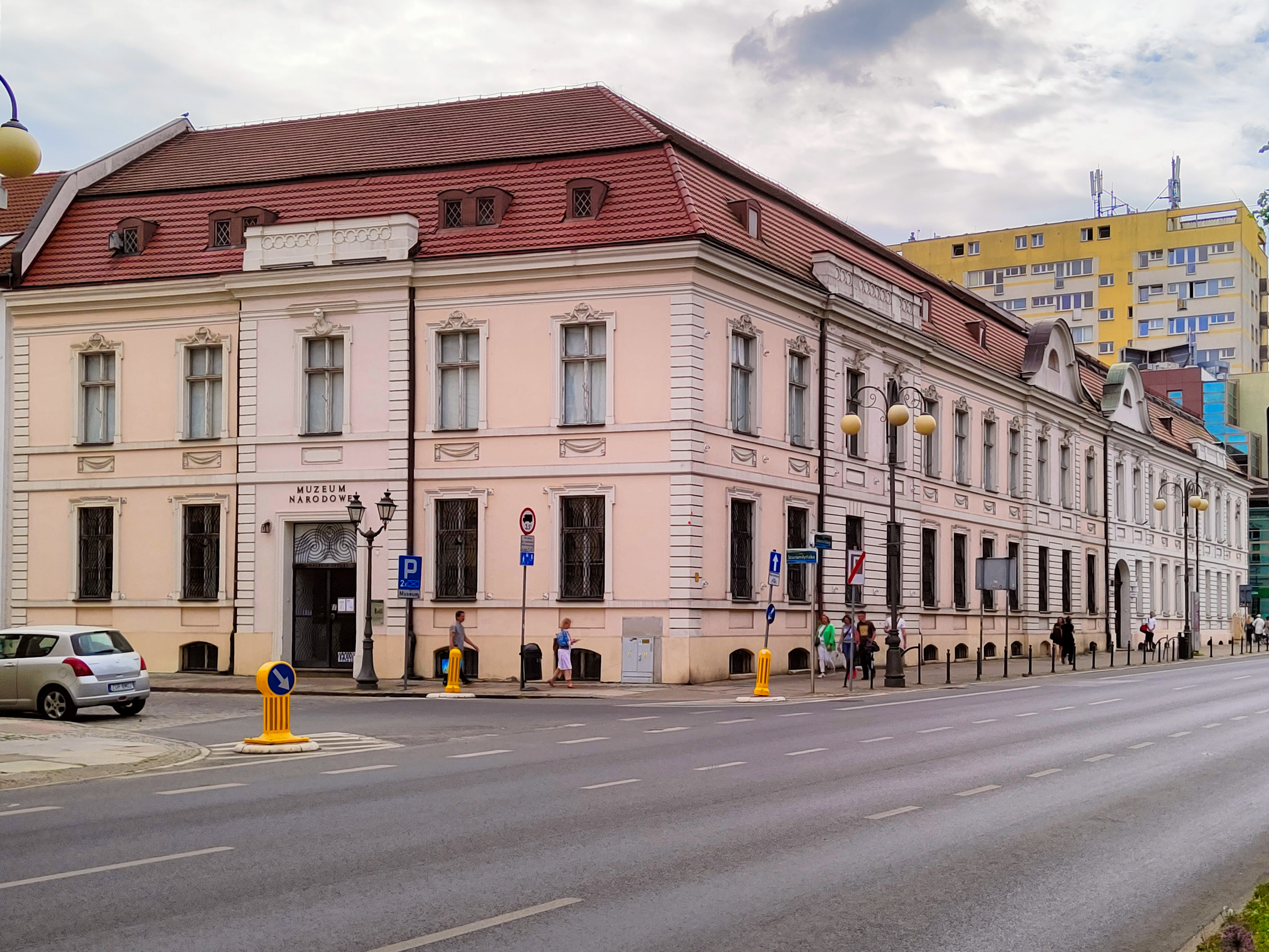
The building in 2023, as seen from Staromłyńska Street.

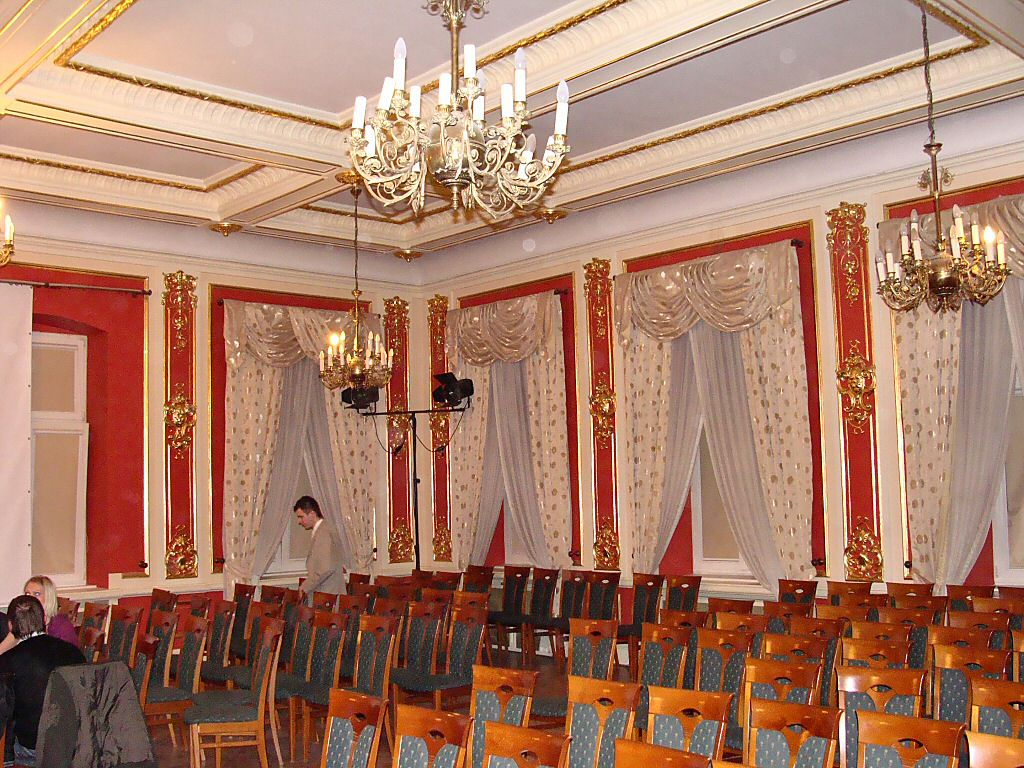
The Furness Room in the Dom Kultury 13 Muz.

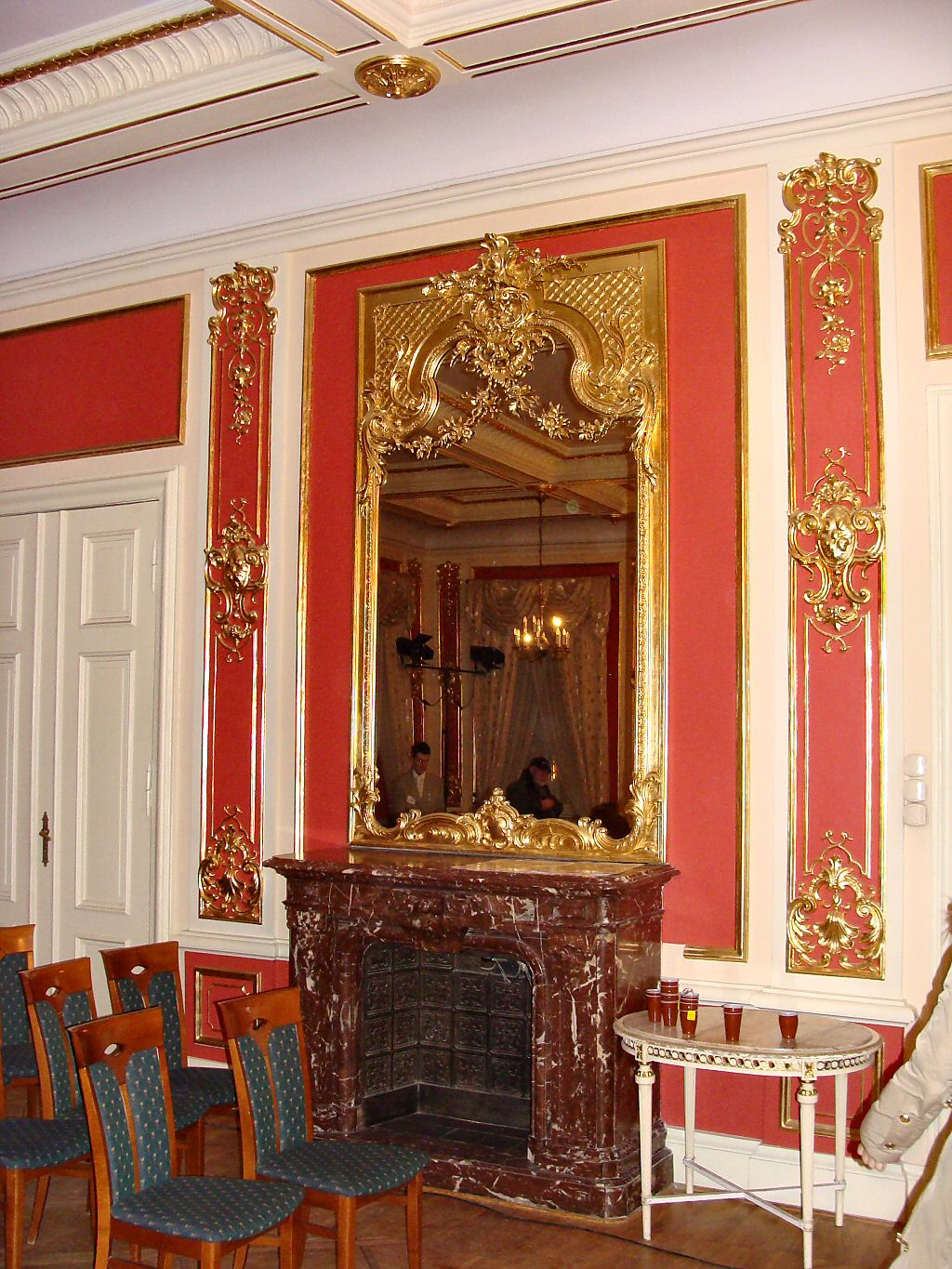
The historical furness.

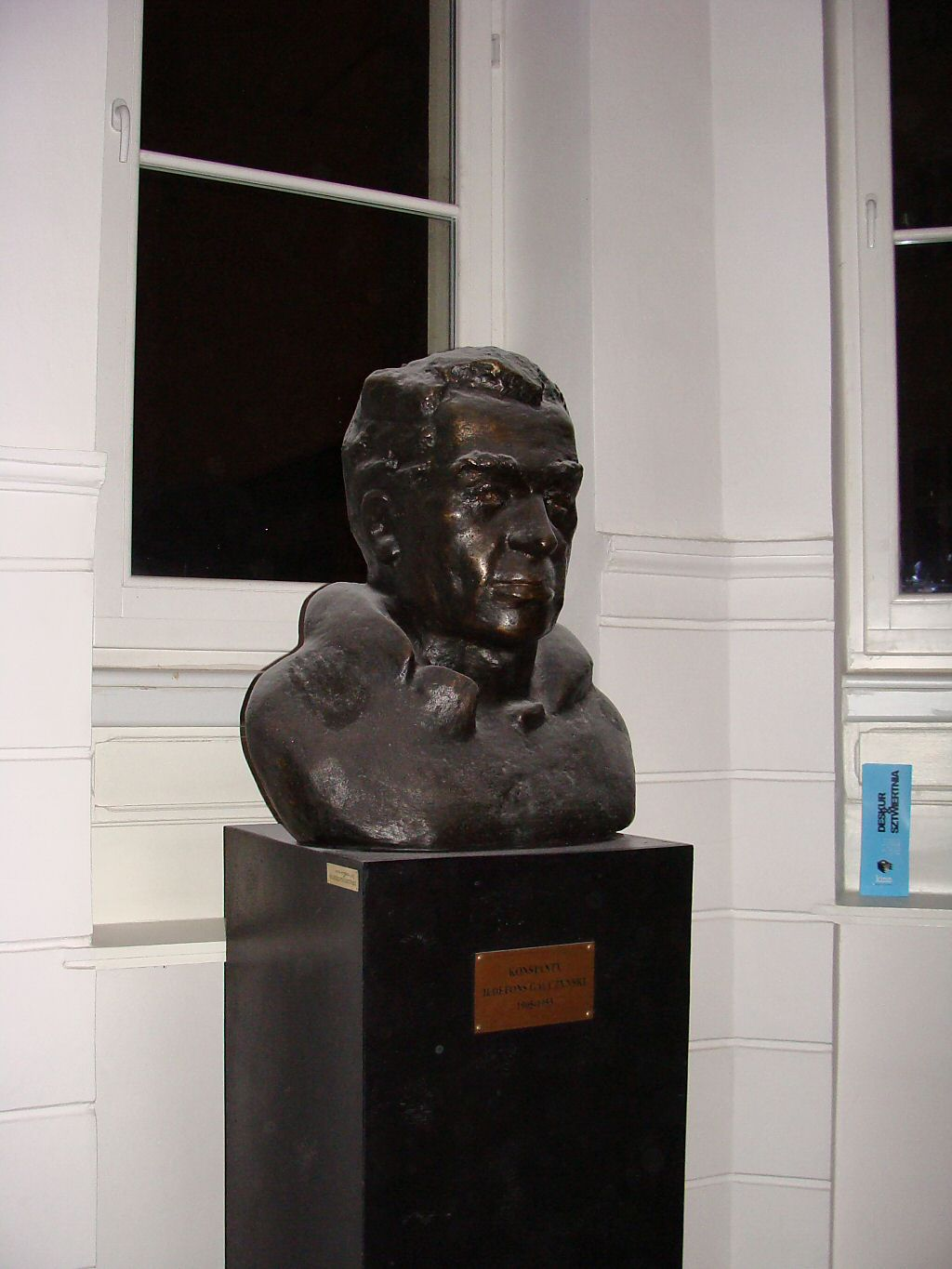
A bust of Konstanty Ildefons Gałczyński, founder of the Dom Kultury 13 Muz.

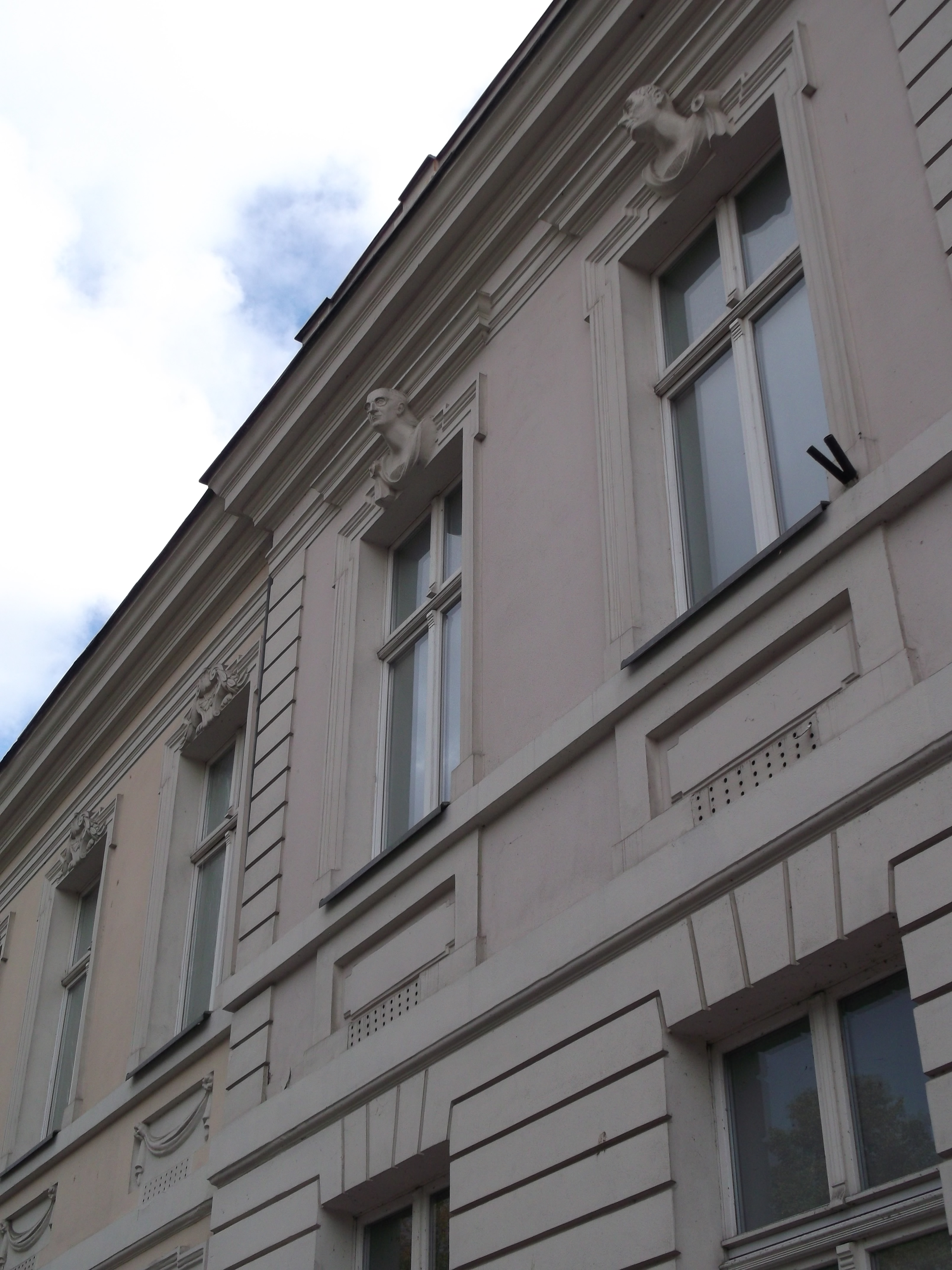
The façade, including two of the head sculptures.
