= Karl Hilgers =

German sculptor (1844–1925)

Karl Hermann Joseph Hubert Hilgers (17 January 1844 – 25 February 1925) was a German sculptor.

== Life ==
Born in Düsseldorf, the son of the landscape painter Carl Hilgers, he studied at the Kunstakademie Düsseldorf with August Wittig from 1864 to 1870. During a study trip he lived in Rome from 1873 to 1876. 1876–1895 he worked in Berlin, where he also received the title professor. 1895–1898 he was again active in Rome with a stay in the Villa Strohl-Fern, 1898–1902 in Florence and from 1902 again in Berlin. In the period 1896/1897 he was chairman of the Deutsche Künstlerverein zu Rome. Hilgers created numerous public monuments and competition designs, with which he was frequently represented at exhibitions from 1880 to 1916 (for example in Berlin, Munich and Düsseldorf) and also received prizes. In 1907, he was awarded a small gold medal at the Große Berliner Kunstausstellung. He was a member of the Verein Berliner Künstler.

Hilgers was married to Maria, née Andreae. He died in Berlin at the age of 81 and was buried at the Stahnsdorf South-Western Cemetery near Berlin.

== Work ==
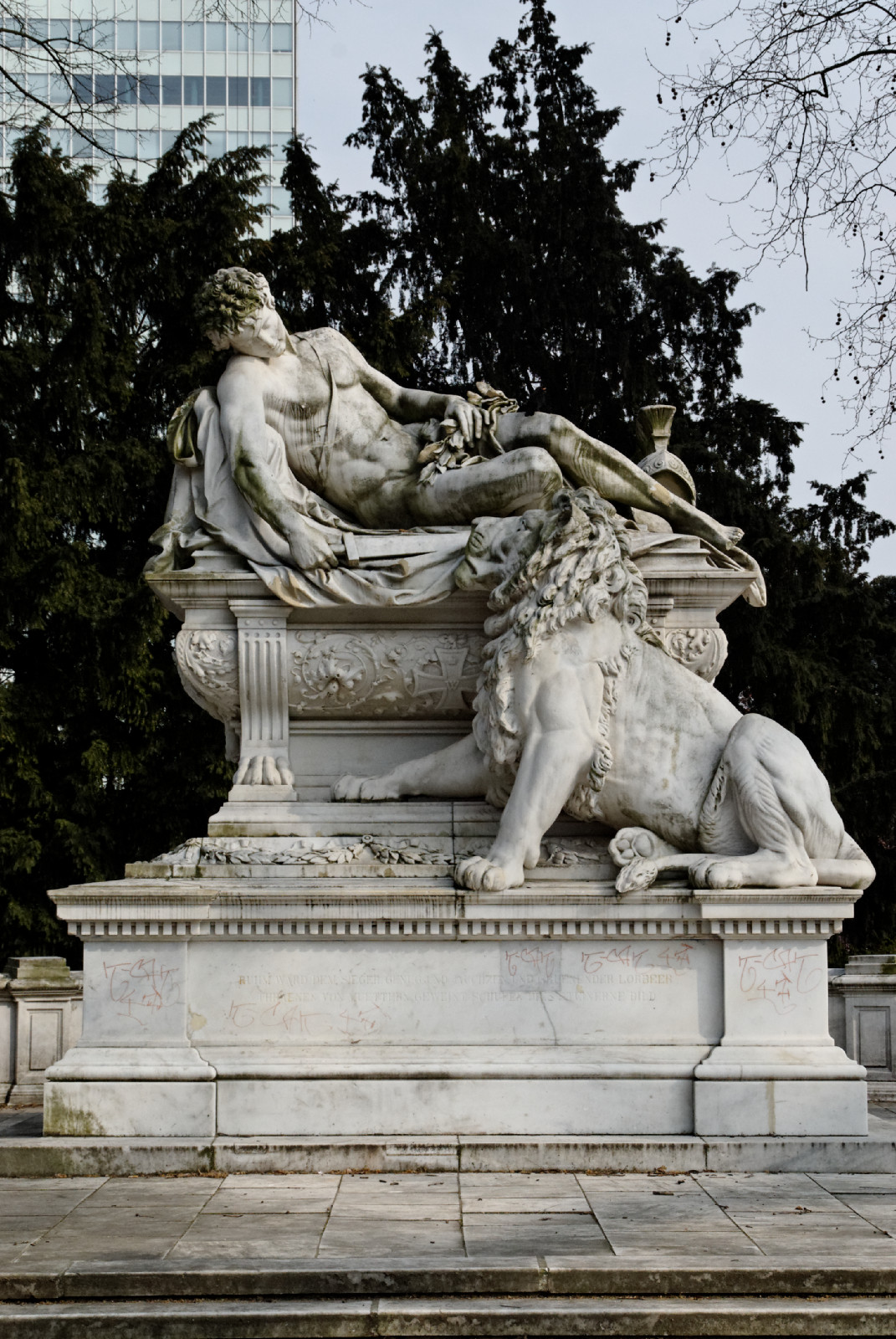
Kriegerdenkmal im Hofgarten (Düsseldorf), war memorial commemorating the fallen of the Franco-Prussian War of 1870/1871 at the Landskrone in the Hofgarten Düsseldorf

- 1879: Genius der Kunst, on the façade of the former Kunsthalle in Düsseldorf (lost)
- 1883: Colossal statue of Frederick William I of Prussia in the Hall of Fame at Berlin Zeughaus
- 1888: Lessing-Denkmal in Berlin. According to Meyer's Großes Konversations-Lexikon, Hilgers won first prize in the competition in 1887; the sculptor was Otto Lessing.
- 1890: Kriegerdenkmal in Düsseldorf Court Garden
- 1894: Equestrian monument of William I, German Emperor in Stettin
- 1897: Marble figure Muse (Nationalgalerie Berlin)
- 1907: Marble statue Judith
- 1912: Minerva fountain in front of the Alte Bibliothek in Berlin
- Marble group Eva an Abels Leiche
- Bronze statue Rudolf I of Germany, in Hamburg City Hall on the market side between the window niches
- four virtues as allegorical limestone figures for the Reichstag building in Berlin
- Two bronze reliefs for the Dirksen grave monument at Matthäikirchhof in Berlin
