= Pope John Paul II Avenue, Szczecin =

Avenue in Szczecin, Poland

Pope John Paul II Avenue
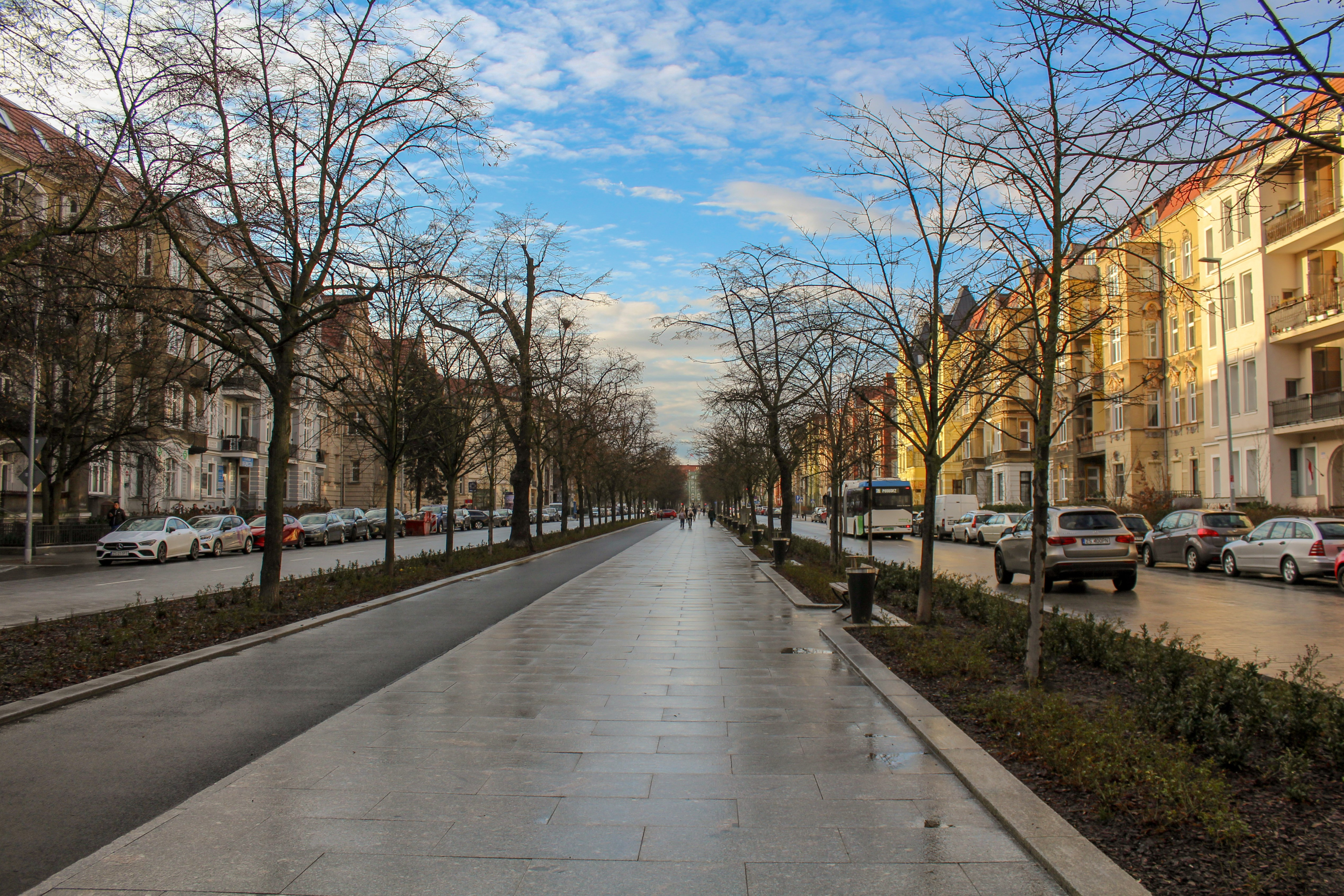
- Pope John Paul II Avenue in Szczecin (2023)
- Former name(s): Emperor Wilhelm Street, National Unity Avenue
- Part of: Centrum, Śródmieście-Północ
- Namesake: Pope John Paul II
- Length: 1,172 m (3,845 ft)
- Location: Szczecin
- Coordinates: 53°25′53″N 14°32′59″E

Overflight of the John Paul II Avenue

Pope John Paul II Avenue (Polish: Aleja Papieża Jana Pawła II), also commonly referred to as the Fountain Avenue (Polish: Aleja Fontann) is an avenue located in the areas of the Centrum and Śródmieście-Północ neighborhoods in the Śródmieście district of Szczecin. The avenue is 1.18 km long and runs from the southeast to the northwest, connecting Polish Soldier Square with Wacław Felczak Street. It is a representative downtown avenue with tenement houses listed in the Registry of Cultural Property and the municipal records of monuments. Throughout its entire length, it is part of the Golden Route – a tourist trail connecting the Ducal Castle with the Valley of the Seven Mills.

== History ==
=== Before World War II ===
In 1864, Szczecin urban planner James Hobrecht designed a concept for developing the areas formed after the demolition of Fort Wilhelm, which was located around today's Grunwaldzki Square, as well as on the grounds of the parceled Friedrichschof estate, located north of the fort. Hobrecht completed the plan in 1874. He designed a layout of polygonal squares with radiating streets, the most important of which was provisionally numbered 30. Initially, this street was to be named Lindenstraße, in reference to a similarly situated and significant street in Berlin, but in 1877 it was named after Emperor William I, i.e., Kaiser-Wilhelm-Straße. According to the 1880 downtown development plan, the street was to begin at Königsplatz, (Note: Between 1945 and 1950, Theater Square, since 1950, Polish SoldierS Square.) pass through the square Kaiser-Wilhelm-Platz, (Note: Between 1864 and 1877, Westend Kirchplatz, and since 1945, Grunwaldzki Square.) then at the intersection with Deutsche Straße (Note: Since 1945, Wielkopolska Street.) through the polygonal Ludwigplatz, (Note: No Polish name; the square remained in the area of projects.) and on the Quistorpaue (Note: Since 1945, Jasne Błonia.) grounds through Königsplatz. (Note: No Polish name; the square remained in the area of projects.) Utilizing the possibility of tracing the road through uninhabited areas, a wide corridor was reserved, allowing for future significant widening, including the designation of characteristic front gardens between the roadways and buildings in the northern part of the street.

In 1882, the course of the street was modified by shortening it and finally determining its width. The section south of Grunwaldzki Square (then Wilhelm-Platz) was designated at a width of 48 m – the street included 4 m wide pedestrian sidewalks, two 10 m wide roadways, and a central path for horseback riding. The ground floors of tenements built along this section were intended for shops and services. The section north of the square was designated in a 59 m wide corridor, with front gardens along its edges in front of the tenements serving almost exclusively residential functions (shops and cafes were planned only in corner buildings).

Between 1886 and 1888, a representative building, König-Wilhelms-Gymnasium, (Note: Emperor's William I Gymnasium) was erected on the street according to Richard Rönnebeck's design (currently the rectorate of the University of Szczecin), and in the following decade, the construction of multi-story tenements in the quarters adjacent to the street began. An example of a house built at that time is the eclectic tenement at No. 42 from 1898.

In 1914, plot No. 37 at the corner of Kaiser-Wilhelm-Straße and Preusische Straße (Note: Since 1945, Mazurska Street.) was built with the Finanzamt Stettin Nord (Note: Financial Office of Szczecin-Północ) building. The construction of buildings along the street was essentially completed in 1924. The buildings were luxurious, adorned with deep balconies, bay windows, turrets, richly decorated facades, including walls faced with glazed bricks in contrasting colors. Between 1924 and 1927, at the northern end of the street, a Neo-Baroque building was erected in several stages, designed by Georg Steinmetz for the Province of Pomerania authorities (currently the Szczecin City Hall).

=== World War II ===
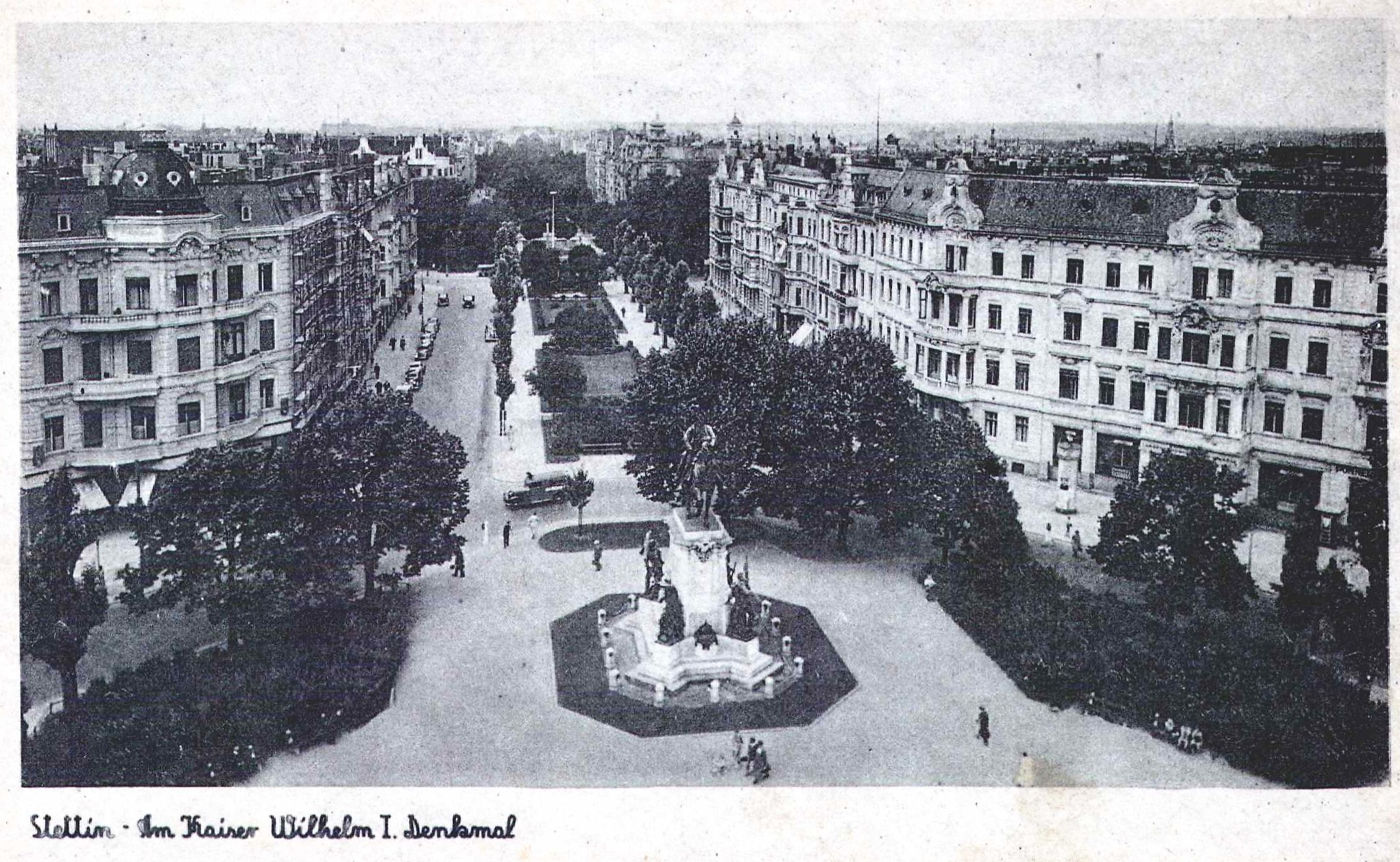
Kaiser-Wilhelm-Straße as seen from Koenigsplatz

During the intense bombings of the city, the street remained intact until 1944. The first damages occurred as a result of an air raid conducted on the night of January 5/6 of that year. The buildings along the street suffered significant damage, and in the southern part, around Lotników Square, they were almost completely destroyed in a carpet bombing raid on the night of August 16/17, 1944.

=== From 1945 to 1989 ===
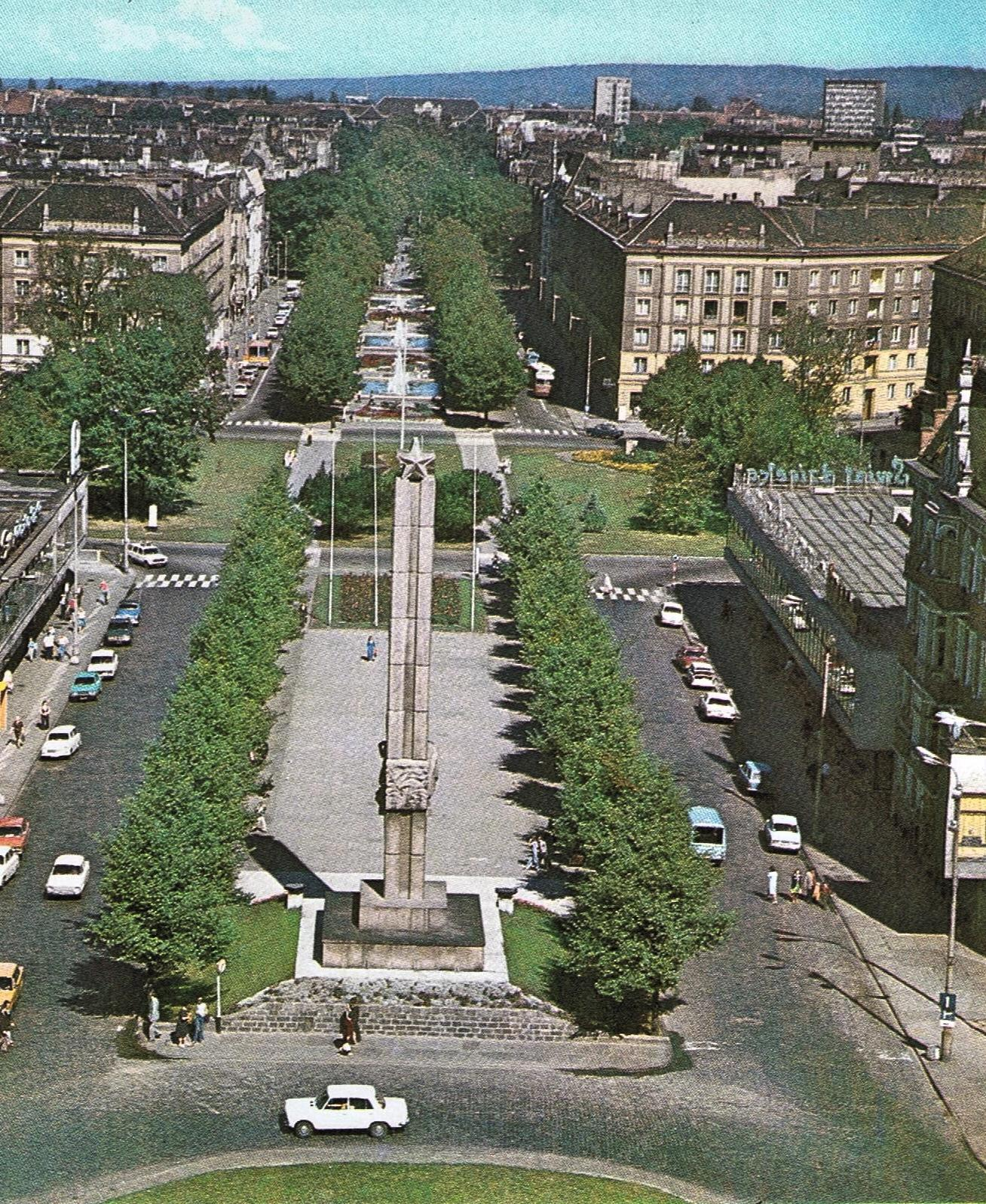
National Unity Avenue with the Monument of Gratitude to the Soviet Army and the Śródmiejska Residential District (1978)

After the end of World War II, Kaiser-Wilhelm-Straße was one of the first streets settled by the Polish population arriving in the city and one of the first streets to receive a Polish name. On 5 July 1945, the building of the former provincial administration was occupied by the first Polish city administration led by Mayor Piotr Zaremba. On 15 July 1945, a mass was celebrated on the nearby Bright Meadows, after which a ceremonial procession of its participants took place along National Unity Avenue to Grunwaldzki Square. In 1947, several institutions were located on the avenue: the Extraordinary Housing Commission (No. 31), the Regional Labor Inspectorate (No. 31), the Regional Trade Union Commission (No. 31), the Tax Chamber (No. 37), the First Tax Office (No. 37), and the Social Insurance Institution (No. 12).

In 1950, a monument of Gratitude to the Soviet Army in the form of an obelisk topped with a five-pointed star was erected at the avenue's exit to Żołnierza Polskiego Square. The new city authorities decided to include part of the avenue in the project of the Śródmiejska Residential District, modeled on Warsaw's Marszałkowska Residential District. A team of architects consisting of Henryk Nardy, W. Adamczyk, and Emanuel Maciejewski designed two five-story socialist-realist residential units with pitched roofs between 1952 and 1954. These units were intended to replace the war-damaged tenements on the section from Grunwaldzki Square to Lotników Square. Construction was completed in 1958. These were the first residential buildings constructed in the city after the end of World War II.

In the 1970s, the central part of National Unity Avenue, on the section from Lotników Square to Grunwaldzki Square, was transformed into a promenade with fountains. Just before Grunwaldzki Square, the Monument of Sailor, created by Ryszard Chachulski, was erected on 19 June 1980.

=== After 1989 ===
By the resolution of the Szczecin City Council No. X/284/07 dated 11 June 2007, National Unity Avenue was renamed to John Paul II Avenue.

In 2006, the fountains on the section known as the Fountain Avenue were renovated. In 2015, as part of the Green Front Gardens of Szczecin program, the historical appearance of flower gardens in front of buildings Nos. 13, 14, 15, and 17 was restored. In 2016, the flower gardens in front of buildings Nos. 18, 19, 20, 21, 22, 32, 33, 34, and 36 were also renovated.

On 6 February 2020, a tender was announced for the renovation of the section from Grunwaldzki Square to Wacław Felczak Street. The scope of work included replacing the pre-war pavers with new ones, modernizing the pedestrian walkway between the roadways and sidewalks, reconstructing the traffic lights, and upgrading the water and sewage network. Additionally, the installation of small architectural elements such as trash bins, benches, bicycle stands, and posts to prevent illegal parking was planned. The consortium Roverpol and Rover Infraestructuras won the tender and was expected to complete the work by mid-October 2021. However, the renovated section of the avenue was handed over for use with a delay on 1 April 2022.

== Names ==
Throughout its history, the street has been known by the following names:

- Emperor Wilhelm Street – from 1877 to 1945
- National Unity Avenue – from 1945 to 2007
- John Paul II Avenue – since 2007

== Road layout ==
The street connects with the following public roads:

| Connection type | Road |
|---|---|
| intersection, beginning of the street | Polish Soldier Square: Edmund Bałuka Street; Liberation Avenue |
| intersection | Lotników Square: Kaszubska Street; Jagiellońska Street; Mazurska Street; Małopolska Street |
| intersection | Grunwaldzki Square: Piłsudski Street; Śląska Street; Rayski Street |
| intersection | Mazurska Street |
| intersection | Wielkopolska Street |
| intersection | Niedziałkowski Street |
| intersection, end of the street | Home Army Square: Felczak Street |

The street is situated on land lots with a total area of 36,073 m^{2}, and the total length of roads assigned to the street is 1,172 m.

=== Roads and land lots ===
| Road | Length | Plot | Area |
|---|---|---|---|
| County road from Polish Soldier Square to Felczak Street | 99 m | 11/2 | 4,811 m^{2} |
| County road from Polish Soldier Square to Felczak Street | 207 m | 16/1 | 10,059 m^{2} |
| County road from Polish Soldier Square to Felczak Street | 670 m | 3 | 13,331 m^{2} |
| County road from Polish Soldier Square to Felczak Street | 196 m | 20 | 7,872 m^{2} |
| County road from Polish Soldier Square to Felczak Street | 1,172 m | total | 36,073 m^{2} |

== Buildings and development ==
The initial section of the avenue, from Polish Soldier Square to Aviators Square, is almost entirely occupied by post-war buildings, including three commercial pavilions and a high-rise building. Only one tenement house, numbered 2, remains on the right side of this section. Between Lotników Square and Grunwaldzki Square, there is a continuous row of buildings on both sides of the street, comprising the Śródmiejska district residential units in the socialist-realist style built in the 1950s and a few preserved pre-war tenement houses.

From Grunwaldzki Square to Mazurska Street and from Mazurska Street to Wielkopolska Street, the avenue is lined exclusively with four- and five-story tenement houses, except for the police station building of Szczecin Niebuszewo. The next short section from Wielkopolska Street to Mieczysław Niedziałkowski Street has a different character: a fire reservoir is located on the left side, while the right side houses the rectorate building of the University of Szczecin. The final section of the avenue, between Mieczysław Niedziałkowski Street and Wacław Felczak Street, features modernist tenement houses on the left and tenement houses interspersed with a residential unit on the right. The perspective of the street is closed to the north by the City Hall of Szczecin building and to the south by two high-rise buildings at the Polish Soldier Square.

The central part of the avenue is developed differently depending on the section. Between the Polish Soldier Square and Aviators Square, the space between the roadways is occupied by Paweł Adamowicz Square. From Lotników Square to Grunwaldzki Square, the central part is arranged as a promenade with dining pavilions and fountains, from which this section of the avenue gets its name Fountain Avenue. The dominant feature of this section is the Monument of Sailor at the intersection with Grunwaldzki Square. From Grunwaldzki Square to Wielkopolska Street, the central part is a pedestrian and bicycle path. The central part of the final section of the avenue was previously occupied by flower beds and the Pomeranian Griffin Monument but has been transformed into a pedestrian and bicycle path due to the redevelopment of this part of the avenue.

Buildings and development

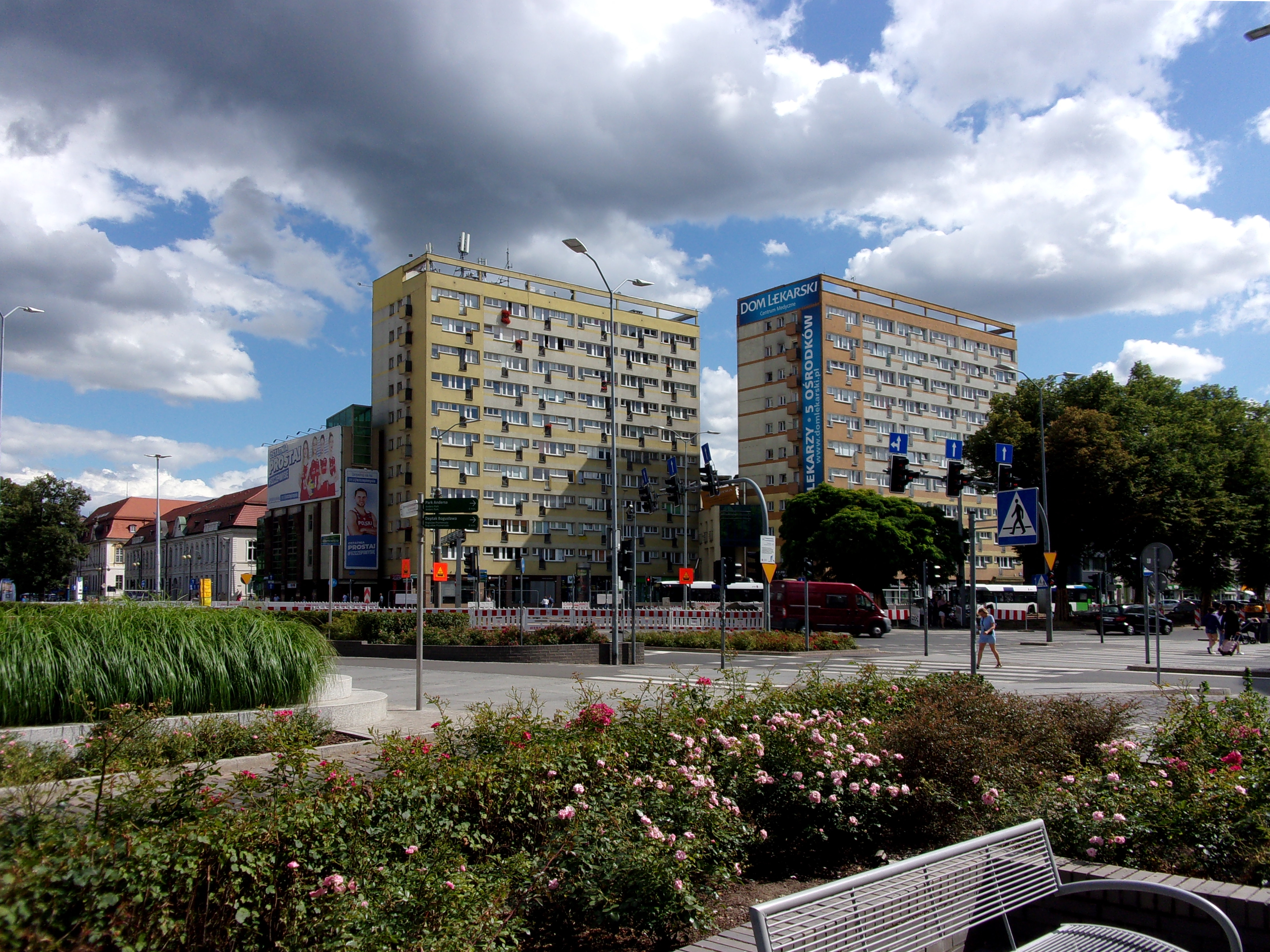
Intersection of the avenue with Polish Soldier Square

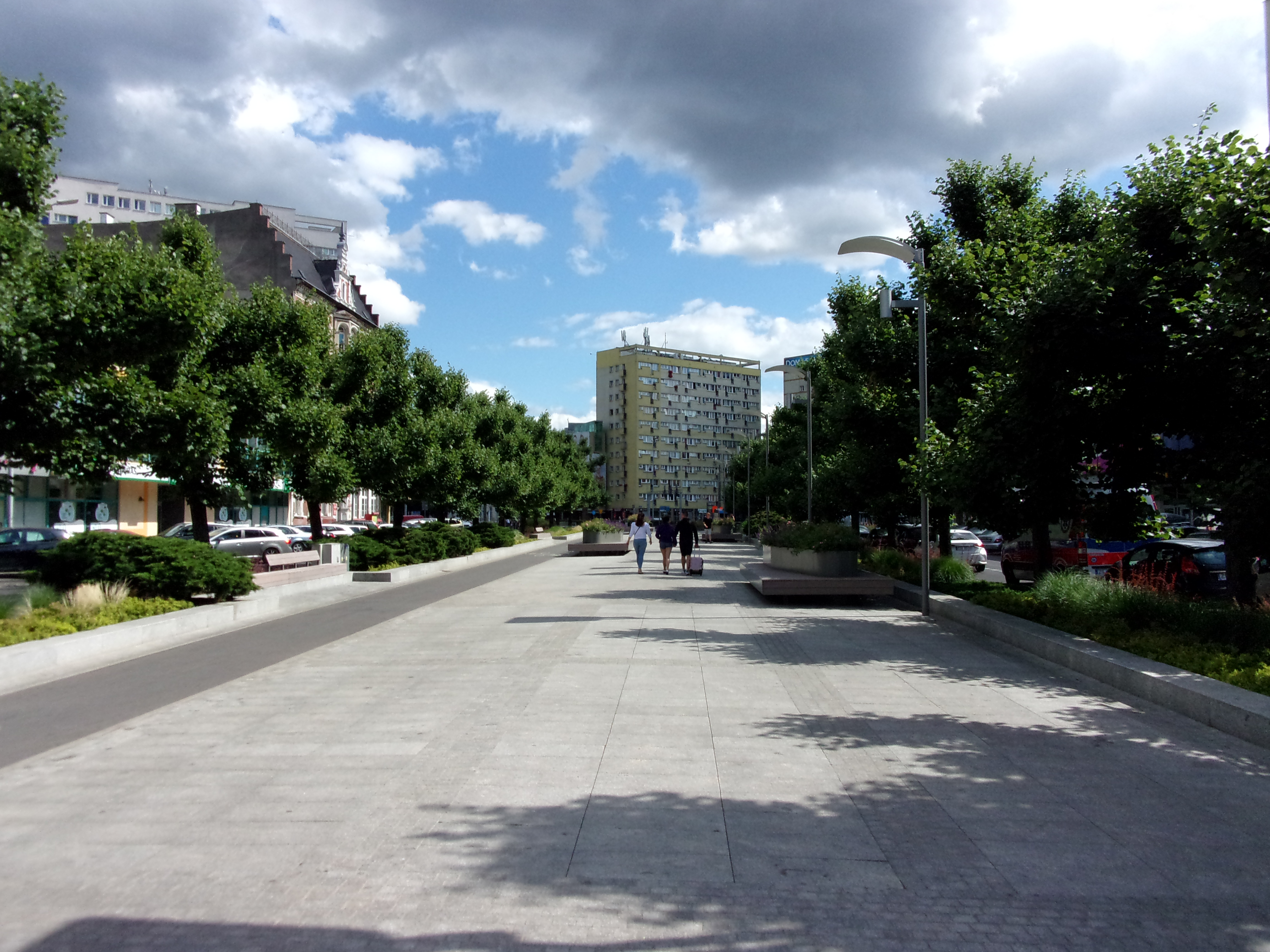
Paweł Adamowicz Square

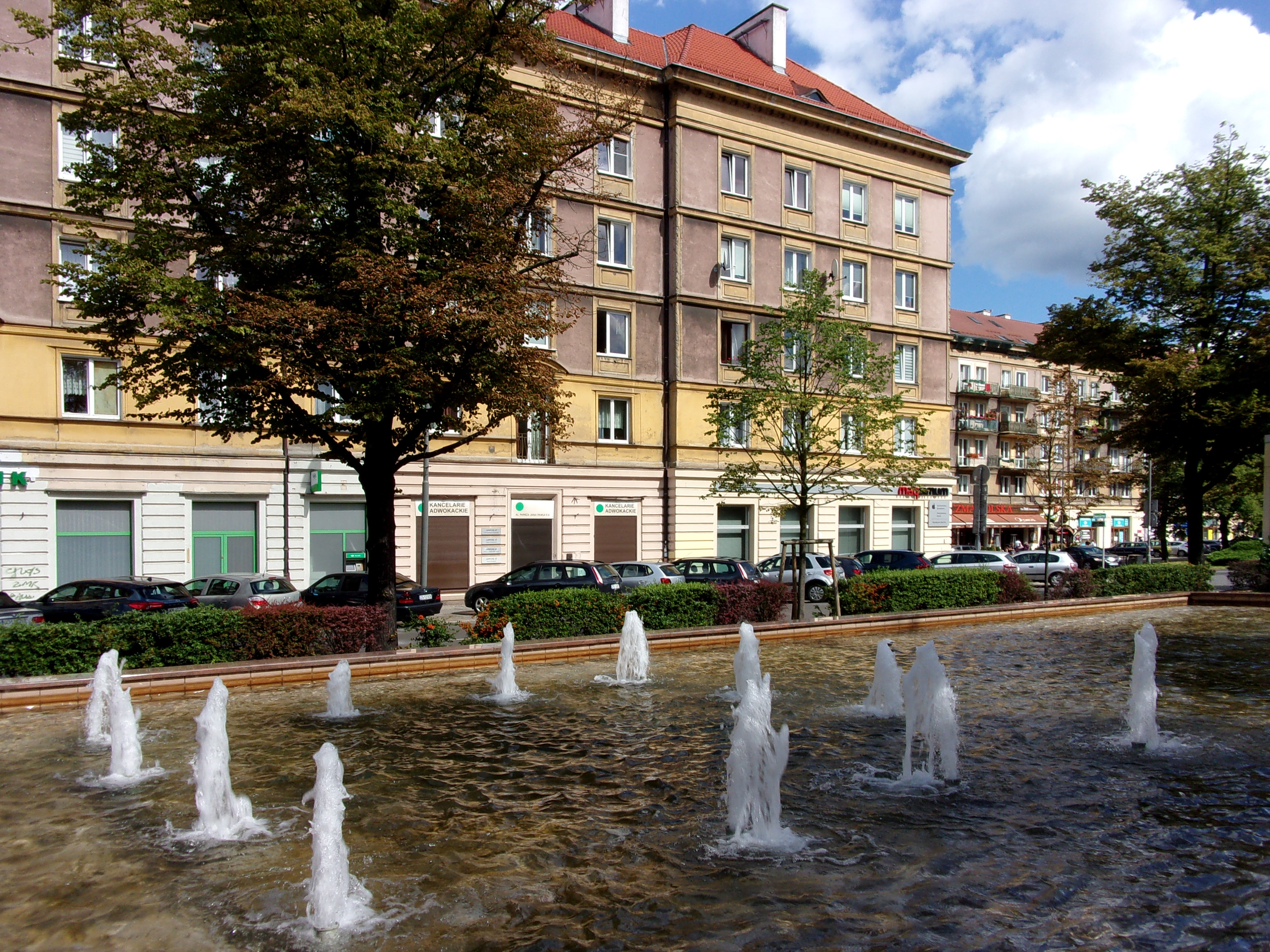
Fountain Avenue

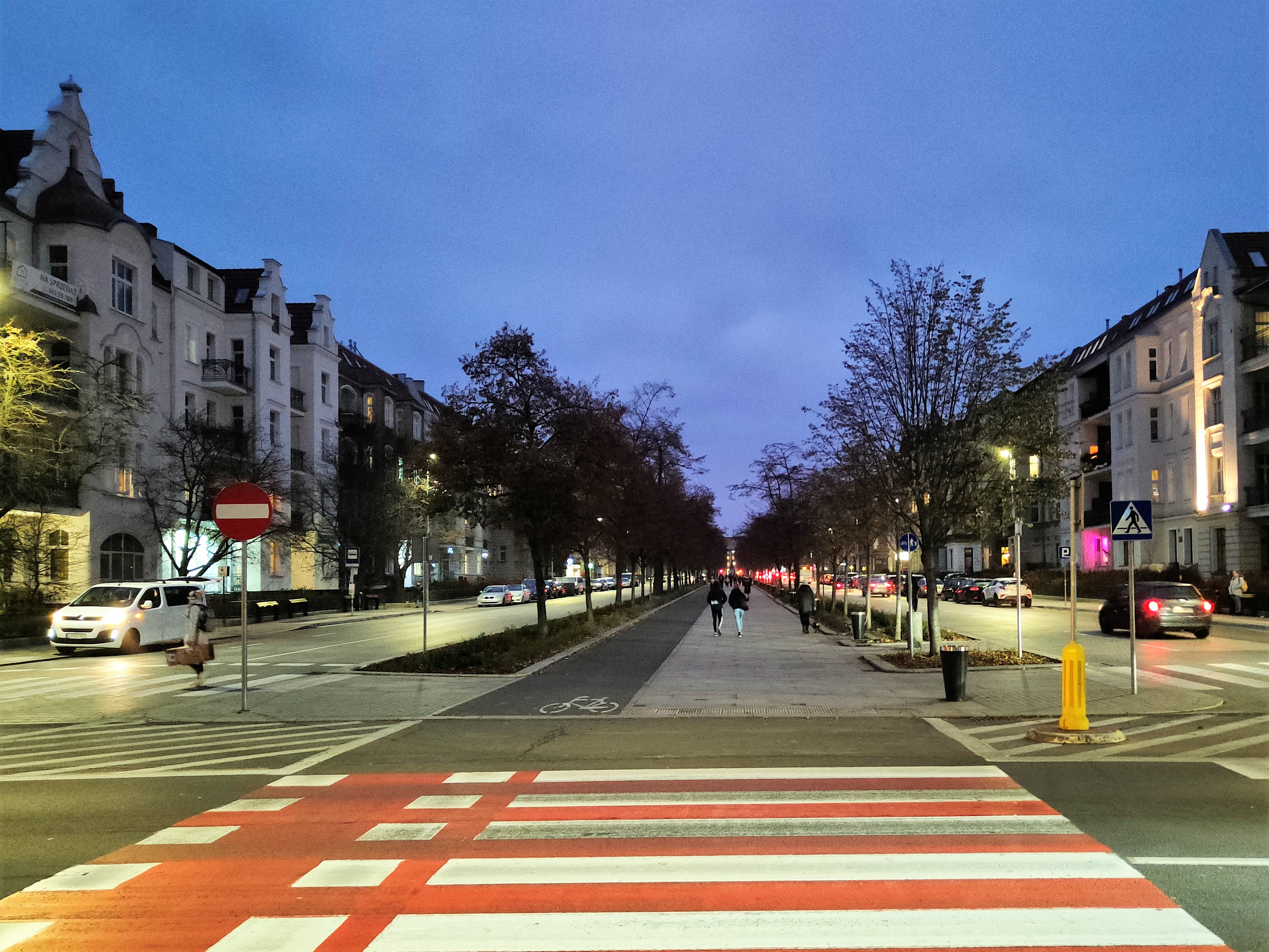
Pedestrian and bicycle path at night

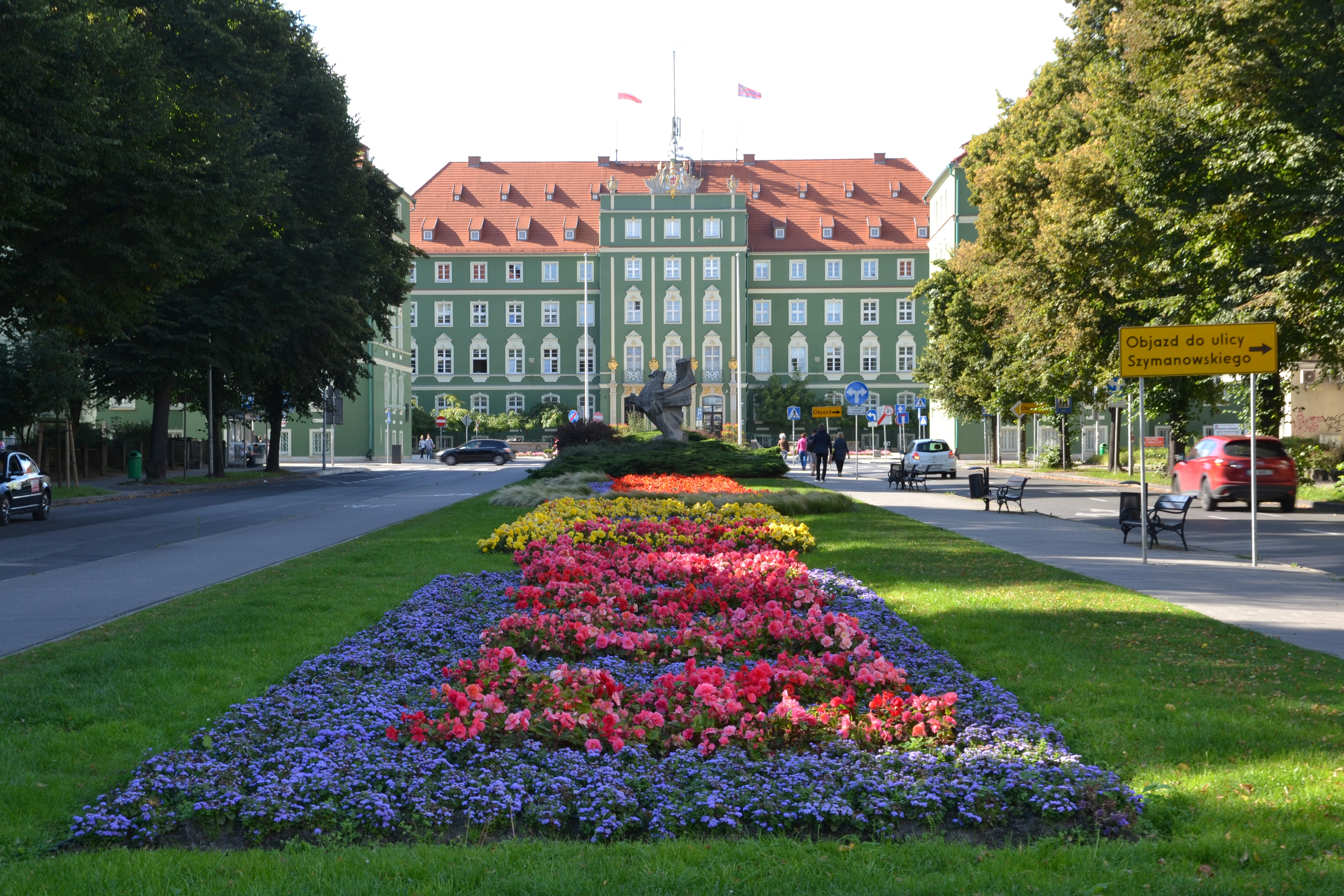
Flower beds with the City Hall of Szczecin in the background

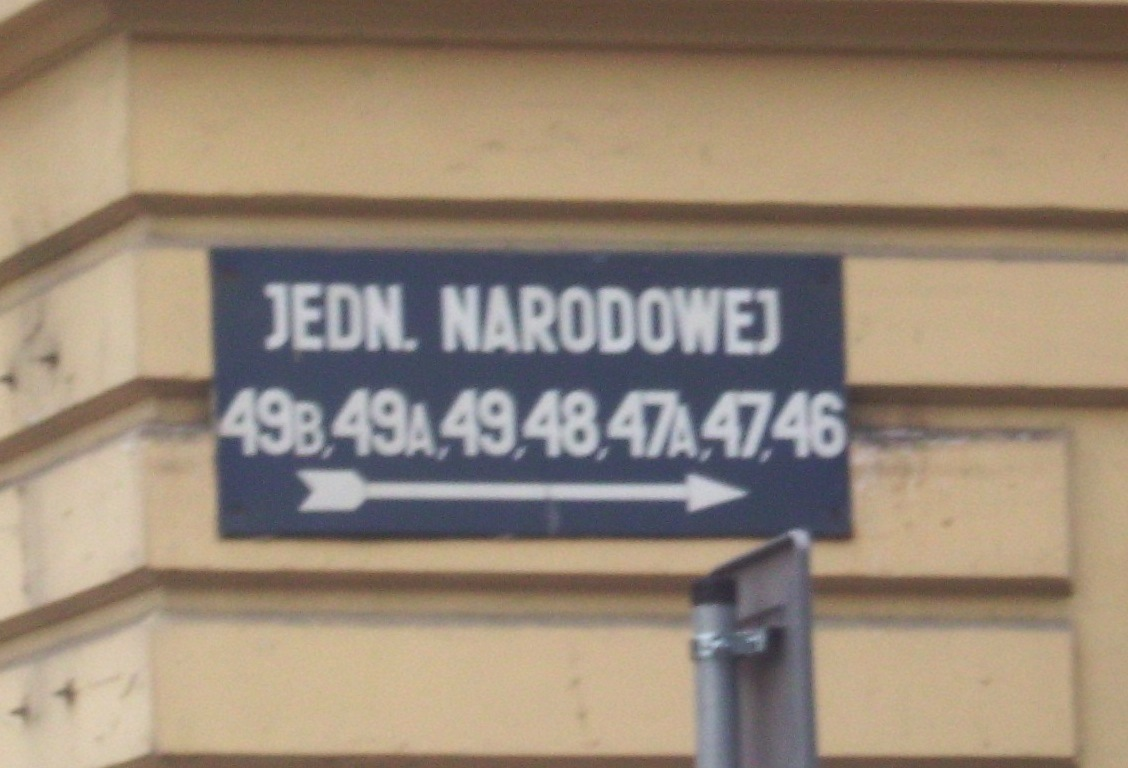
Plaque with the previous street name (no longer existing)

== Preservation and monuments ==
The following historic sites and monuments are located along the street and in its immediate vicinity:

| Building and location | Description and form of preservation | Photo |
eastern side
| tenement John Paul II Avenue | municipal register of monuments | |
| residential unit 5–10 John Paul II Avenue 45–46a Mazurska Street | municipal register of monuments | |
| tenement 11 John Paul II Avenue | register of monuments (Reg. No. 814, October 22, 1976) | |
| tenement 12 John Paul II Avenue Grunwaldzki Square Piłsudski Street | municipal register of monuments | |
| tenement 13 John Paul II Avenue Grunwaldzki Square | municipal register of monuments | |
| tenement 15 John Paul II Avenue | municipal register of monuments | |
| tenement 16 John Paul II Avenue Mazurska Street | municipal register of monuments | |
| tenement 17 John Paul II Avenue Mazurska Street | municipal register of monuments | |
| tenement 18 John Paul II Avenue Mazurska Street | municipal register of monuments | |
| tenement 19 John Paul II Avenue | municipal register of monuments | |
| tenement 22 John Paul II Avenue | municipal register of monuments | |
| budynek szkolny 22a John Paul II Avenue | Rectorate of the University of Szczecin, register of monuments (Reg. No. 119, March 18, 2003) | |
| tenement 23 John Paul II Avenue | municipal register of monuments | |
| tenement 27 John Paul II Avenue | municipal register of monuments | |
| tenement 28 John Paul II Avenue | municipal register of monuments | |
| tenement 29 John Paul II Avenue | municipal register of monuments | |
western side
| tenement 31 John Paul II Avenue | municipal register of monuments | |
| tenement 35 John Paul II Avenue | municipal register of monuments | |
| tenement 36 John Paul II Avenue | municipal register of monuments | |
| office building 37–37a John Paul II Avenue Mazurska Street | Szczecin Niebuszewo Police Station, register of monuments (Reg. No. 388, April 15, 2009) | |
| tenement 38 John Paul II Avenue | municipal register of monuments | |
| tenement 41 John Paul II Avenue Grunwaldzki Square | municipal register of monuments | |
| tenement 42 John Paul II Avenue Grunwaldzki Square | register of monuments (Reg. No. 862, November 3, 1976) | |
| interior of a pharmacy 42 John Paul II Avenue Grunwaldzki Square | register of monuments (Reg. No. 862, January 24, 1977) | |
| tenement 43 John Paul II Avenue | municipal register of monuments | |
| tenement 45 John Paul II Avenue | municipal register of monuments | |
| residential unit 46–49b John Paul II Avenue | municipal register of monuments | |
