= White Eagle =

White Eagle(s) may refer to:

== History and politics ==
- Coat of arms of Poland, depicting a white eagle in a red shield
- Crusade of Romanianism, or White Eagles, a 1930s far-right movement in Romania
- Task Force White Eagle, a Polish military unit during the War in Afghanistan 2002–2021
- White Eagles (paramilitary), a 1990s Serbian paramilitary group

== Film ==
- White Eagle (1922 serial), an American Western film serial
- The White Eagle, a 1928 Soviet silent drama film
- White Eagle (1932 film), an American Western directed by Lambert Hillyer
- White Eagle (1941 film), an Argentine drama directed by Carlos Hugo Christensen
- White Eagle (1941 serial), an American film serial based on the 1932 film
- White Eagle (1942 short film), a Polish-British short film nominated for Best Documentary Film at the 15th Academy Awards (Note: The 15th Academy Awards, held in 1943, was the only one where Documentary Short and Documentary Feature were combined in one category, complete with 25 films nominated and 4 films awarded with Oscars)
- White Eagle Enterprises, a film production company founded by Sylvester Stallone

== Sports ==
- Bonnyrigg White Eagles FC, an Australian soccer club based in Bonnyrigg
- Dianella White Eagles SC, an Australian soccer club based in Perth
- New Town Eagles SC, originally White Eagle, an Australian soccer club based in Hobart
- Serbian White Eagles FC, a Canadian soccer team based in Toronto
- Springvale White Eagles FC, an Australian soccer club based in Melbourne

== Structures ==
- White Eagle Fountain, a 1732 Baroque fountain in Szczecin, Poland
- White Eagle Hall, a venue in Jersey City, New Jersey, US
- White Eagle Municipal Stadium, a venue in Legnica, Poland
- White Eagle Museum, a Polish military museum in Skarżysko-Kamienna, Świętokrzyskie Voivodeship, Poland
- White Eagle Square, an urban square in Szczecin, Poland

== Other uses ==
- Chief White Eagle (c. 1825–1914), Native American chief of the Ponca, politician, and civil rights leader
- White Eagle (album), a 1982 album by Tangerine Dream
- White Eagle (Twilight: 2000), a 1990 tabletop game adventure
- White Eagle, Oklahoma, US, an unincorporated community
- White Eagle Aviation, a Polish airline
- The White Eagle Lodge, a spiritual organization in England

== See also ==
- Order of the White Eagle (disambiguation)
- White-tailed eagle, a large bird of prey
- Aguila Blanca (disambiguation)
- Poland national football team, nicknamed the White Eagles
