= King's Gate =

King's Gate may refer to:

- Gate of the King (Madagascar) in Mahajanga
- King's Gate (Aachen)
- King's Gate (Berlin)
- King's Gate (Hattusa)
- King's Gate (Kaliningrad)
- King's Gate (Kassel)
- King's Gate (Minden)
- King's Gate (Nuremberg)
- King's Gate (Szczecin)
- King's Gate a.k.a. Kuninkaanportti in Helsinki
- Gate of All Nations in the ruins of Persepolis, Iran
- King's gate, a firearm loading mechanism designed by Nelson King for the Winchester Model 1866

== See also ==
- Kingsgate (disambiguation)
