= Velthusen Palace =

Historical building in Szczecin, Poland

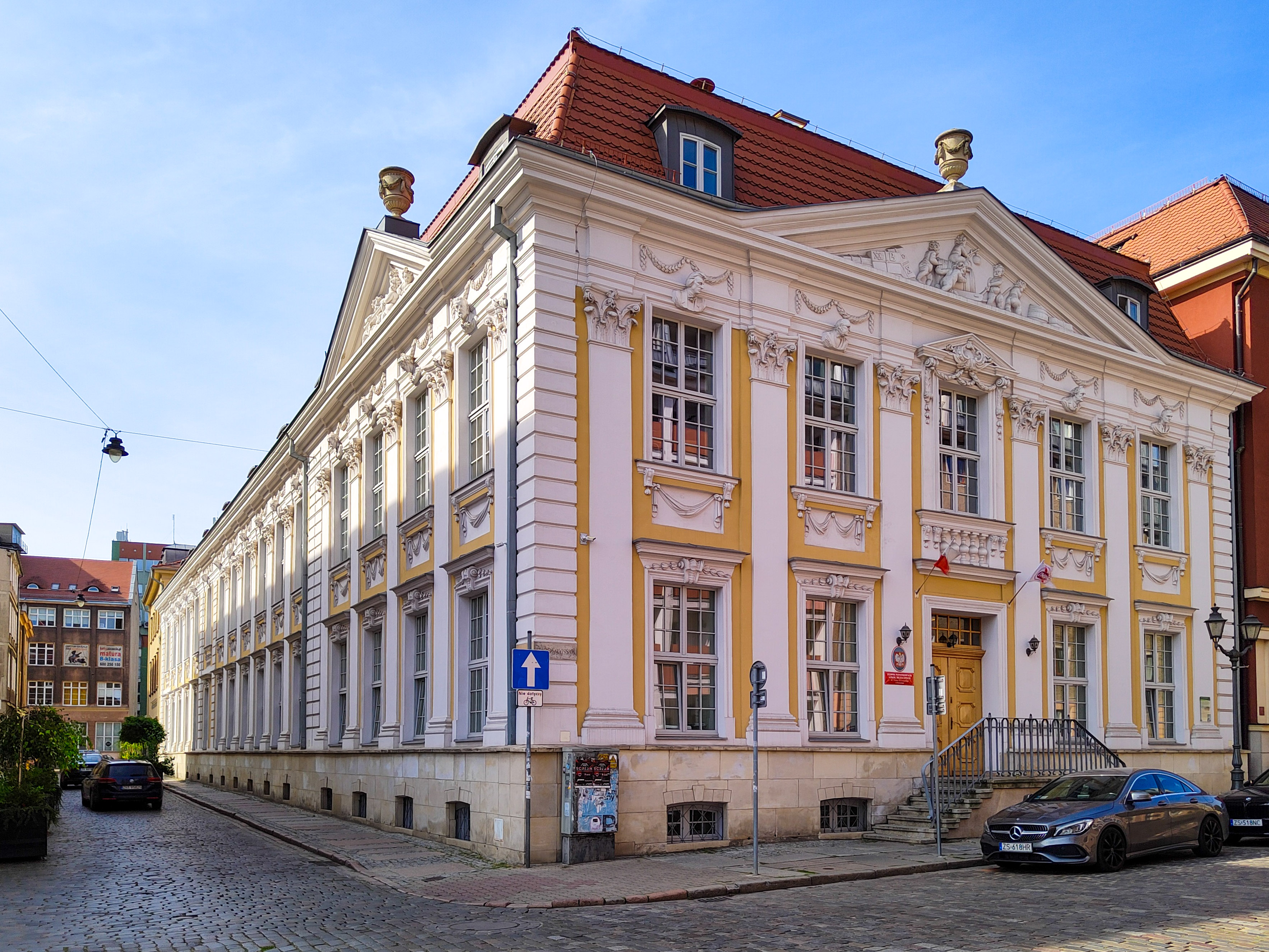
- The building in 2022.
- Interactive map of the Velthusen Palace area

General information
- Type: Tenement, palace
- Architectural style: Baroque, neoclassical
- Location: Szczecin, Poland, 13 Staromłyńska Street
- Coordinates: 53°25′36″N 14°33′15″E
- Construction started: 1778
- Completed: 1779

Technical details
- Floor count: 4

The Velthusen Palace (German pronunciation: [velˈtʊ.sn̩]; Polish: Pałac Velthusena; German: Palais Velthusen), also known as the Wolkenhauer House (German pronunciation: [ˈvɔl.kənˌhaʊ̯ɐ]; Polish: Dom Wolkenhauera; German: Wolkenhauer-Haus), is a historic Baroque and neoclassical tenement house in Szczecin, Poland. It is located at 13 Staromłyńska Street, at the corner with Łaziebna Street, and next to the White Eagle Square, within the Old Town neighbourhood of the Downtown district. It was constructed in 1779, originally housing a wine store and a winery, and later a piano store and production facility, and a bank. It was destroyed in 1943 during the Second World War, and rebuilt between 1959 and 1962. Currently, it houses the Feliks Nowowiejski Music School.

== History ==
The property on which the palace was later built had belonged to the city of Szczecin (then Stettin) since the 13th century. In 1559, Johann Eichorn received permission from duke Barnim XI to establish Stettin's first printing press on this site, which was operated by Eichorn's son-in-law, Andreas Kellner. At the beginning of the 18th century, the property, divided into four parcels, contained two simple tenement houses. These were destroyed in 1713 during the Great Northern War, in a siege laid on the city by the Russian Army. Presumably around 1724, a larger, prestigious residential building was erected there, which housed several prominent Stettin citizen. Mill Street (German: Mühlenstraße), renamed to Louise Street (German: Luisenstraße) in 1806, and now known as Staromłyńska Street, was considered one of the city's most prestigious roads at the time.

In 1778, the merchant Georg Velthusen acquired the property and had his residence built on it in 1779, which still exists to this day. He set up a wine business with a cellar in the building. As a wine merchant, Velthusen supplied all of the Province of Pomerania, northern Poland, and the Netherlands. He also owned granaries and founded a tobacco, sugar and vinegar factories, and became very wealthy from his ventures. The building is believed to have been designed by the architect Carl von Gontard, presumably modeled on the Maurice House in The Hague, Netherlands, with the blend of Baroque and neoclassical styles. Until the Second World War, the window lintels contained busts of philosophers, including Socrates, Seneca the Younger, and Hadrian.

In 1874, Richard Wolkenhauer, owner of the piano manufacturing company Georg Wolkenhauer, acquired the building. Until 1920, it housed the piano store and production facility, and functioned as Wolkenhauer's residence. Until 1888, the first floor housed the photography studio of Eduard Kiewning and his successors, Hermann Moellendorf and Christian Bachmann.

From 1922 to 1943, the Pomeranian Provincial Bank (German: Pommersche Provinzban) had its headquarters in the Velthusen Palace. On 21 April 1943, during the Second World War, the building was destroyed in an aerial bombing. Only the front exterior walls and the cellar vaults survived. In 1954, it was entered into the national heritage list of Poland, and it was rebuilt between 1959 and 1962. The former busts of philosophers were replaced with those of music composers, including Frédéric Chopin, Bedřich Smetana, Igor Stravinsky, Giuseppe Verdi, Carl Loewe, and Edvard Grieg. Since 1963, it houses the Feliks Nowowiejski Music School. Its cellar vaults were renovated in 2010, and its façade, in 2015.

== Architecture ==
The tenement house's design is a blend of the Baroque and neoclassical styles. Both of the sides facing streets feature a tympanum depicting scenes of grape harvest and transport of wine barrels, referring to the building's original purpose of as a wine store. Its window lintels contain 20 busts of music composers, and its façade is lined with sandstone plates. The side on Łaziebna Street features: Edvard Grieg, Johann Sebastian Bach, Ludwig van Beethoven, Carl Loewe, Wolfgang Amadeus Mozart, Jean Sibelius, Claude Debussy, Mikhail Glinka, Antonio Vivaldi, Giuseppe Verdi, Igor Stravinsky, Sergei Prokofiev, Antonín Dvořák, Henryk Wieniawski, Ignacy Jan Paderewski, and Bedřich Smetana. The side on Staromłyńska Street features: Frédéric Chopin, Stanisław Moniuszko, Feliks Nowowiejski, and Karol Szymanowski.
