= Statue of Flora =

1730s Baroque sculpture in Szczecin, Poland

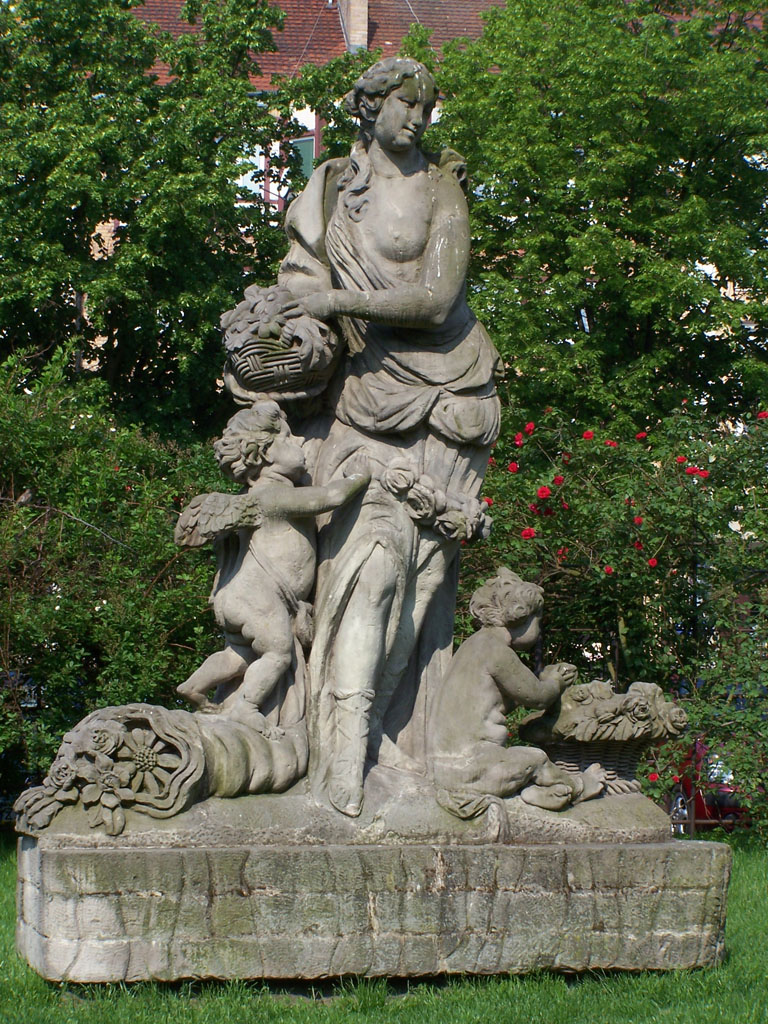
- The statue in 2007.
- Interactive map of Statue of Flora
- Location: White Eagle Square, Old Town, Szczecin, Poland
- Coordinates: 53.425552°N 14.555106°E
- Designer: Johann Konrad Koch (designer); Johann Georg Glume (sculptor)
- Type: Statue
- Material: Sandstone
- Length: 2.5 m (8 ft 2 in)
- Height: 2.9 m (9 ft 6 in)
- Opening date: c. 1730
- Dedicated to: Flora

The statue of Flora (Polish: Posąg Flory Pomnik Flory; German: Florastatue) is a sandstone sculpture in Szczecin, Poland, placed at the White Eagle Square. It consists of a statue of Flora, goddess of flowers and spring in Roman mythology, with two putti standing next to her legs, one with a flower basket, and one with a cornucopia. It was designed by Johann Konrad Koch, and sculptured by Johann Georg Glume around 1730.

== History ==
The Statue of Flora was designed by Johann Konrad Koch, and sculptured by Johann Georg Glume around 1730. It was made from sandstone imported from Saxony in Germany. It was originally placed in the centre of attic of the Grumbkow Palace in Szczecin, where it replaced a wooden statue of a sitting woman, made by Erhard Lőffler, and probably designed by Johann Georg Glume. The change was most likely caused by the renovations done after the building was bought by merchant Jacob Frederick Wietzlow. In the second half of the 19th century, it was moved to the palace garden where it stayed until the building was deconstructed in 1890. In 1906, it was placed in front of the Park Hotel in the Żeromski Park (then known as the Grabowo Gardens).

In 1945, following the end of Second World War, the sculpture was found lying in the ruins in front of the Palace of the Pomeranian Estates Assembly. It was damaged, missing its arms, and two accompanying it putti. Following the restoration works, it was placed at the boundary of the Żeromski Park, and in 1957, was moved next to the King's Gate. In 1986, it was relocated to the intersection of Panieńska and Kuśnierska, and following extensive renovations, moved to the White Eagle Square.

== Characteristics ==
The Baroque sandstone sculpture consists of three statues. Flora, goddess of flowers and spring in the Roman mythology, stands in centre, depicted in a dynamic pose, holding a flower basket in her right hand, and reaching to it with her left hand. She is dressed in a draped dress, grided with a flower garland. Next to her legs stand two putti, figures of chubby male children, depicted naked and with wings. The one to her sits putting flowers to a basket, while the other, stands resting on her leg, on top of a cornucopia. The sculpture has the height of 290 cm, and width of 250 cm.
