= Kingsgate =

Kingsgate may refer to:

== Places ==
- Kingsgate, East Kilbride, Scotland
- Kingsgate, Kent, England, part of Broadstairs
- Kingsgate, Kirkland, Washington
- Kingsgate, Winchester, Hampshire, England
- Kingsgate, British Columbia
- Kingsgate, Dunfermline, an indoor shopping centre located in the town centre of Dunfermline, Fife, Scotland
- Kingsgate, Huddersfield, an indoor shopping centre located in the town centre of Huddersfield, West Yorkshire, England

== Other uses ==
- KingsGate Community Church, a large Christian Church with centres in Peterborough, Cambridge, and Leicester, England
- Kingsgate Consolidated Limited, mining company operating Challenger mine and listed on the ASX as KCN

== See also ==
- King's Gate (disambiguation)
