= Ionic Palace =

Historical building in Szczecin, Poland

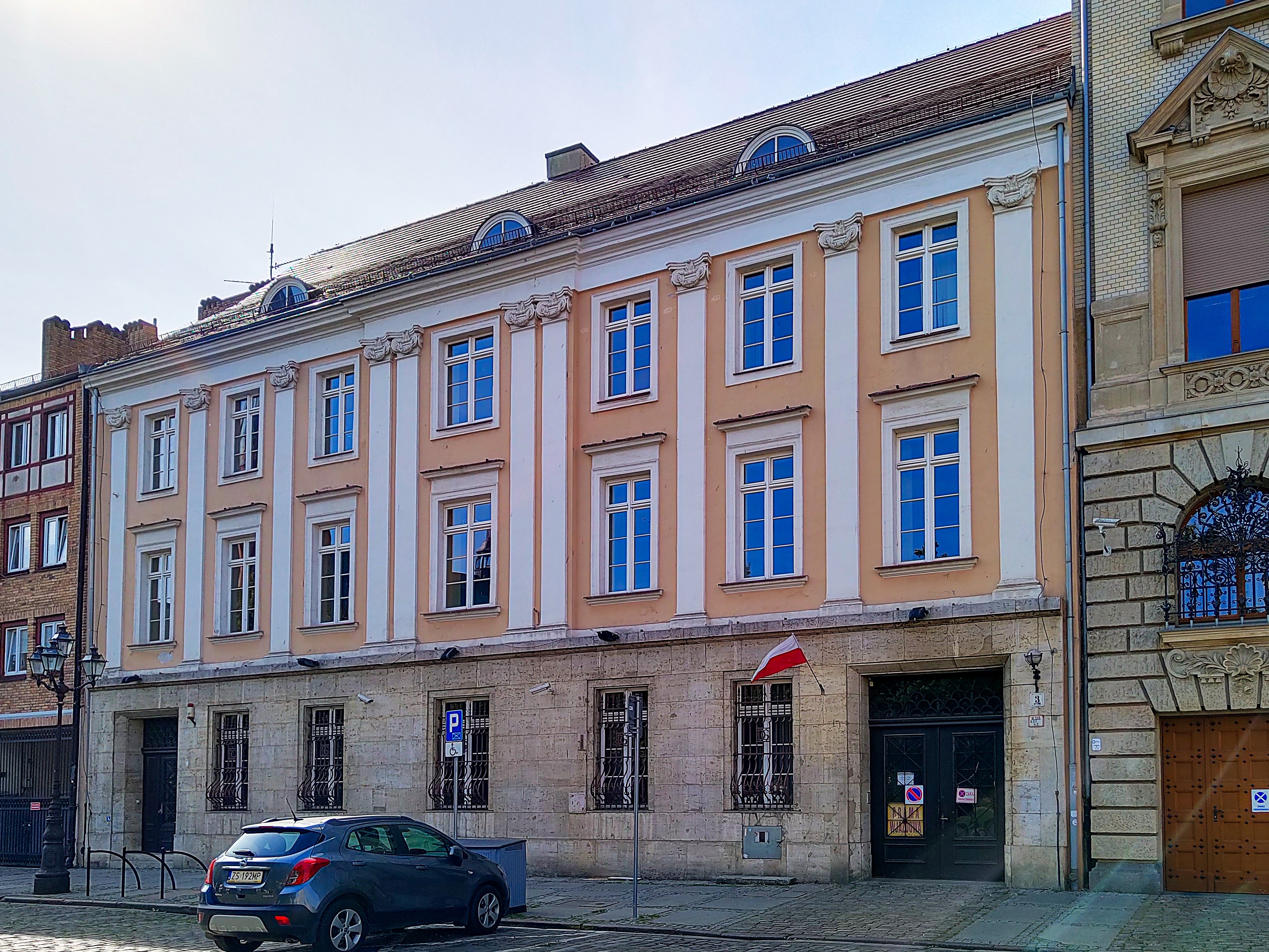
- The building in 2022.
- Interactive map of the Ionic Palace area

General information
- Type: Tenement, palace
- Architectural style: Neoclassical
- Location: 3 White Eagle Square, Old Town, Szczecin, Poland
- Coordinates: 53°25′33.0″N 14°33′14.50″E
- Completed: 18th century

Technical details
- Floor count: 3

The Ionic Palace (Polish: Pałac Joński; German: Ionischer Palast) is a historical neoclassical tenement building in Szczecin, Poland, located at 3 White Eagle Square, in the Old Town neighbourhood. It dates to the 18th century, and was furtherly expanded at the beginning of the next century. Currently it is one of faculty buildings of the Szczecin Art Academy.

== History ==
The building dates to the 18th century, when it was a two-storey tenement owned by head forester Bock. At the beginning of the 19th century, it was expanded with another storey, and its façade was redesigned in the neoclassical style. Later in that century, it became the regional headquarters of the Bank of Prussia, which in 1876 was replaced by the Reichsbank. Following the end of the First World War, it housed the Deutsche Bank. In 1924, it was expanded with a glass-covered hall at the courtyard, designed by local architect Friedrich Liebergesell. After the Second World War, the building continued to house banking institutions such as PKO Bank Polski and Pomorski Bank Kredytowy. In 1955, it received the status of a protected cultural property. From 2000 it was a regional headquarters of the Bank Pekao. In December 2021, it was sold to the Szczecin Art Academy, for 8 million Polish złoties, which then converted it into one of its faculty buildings.

== Characteristics ==
The Ionic Palace is a three-storey tenement building, with a neoclassical façade, which features several Ionic order columns. Currently, it is of faculty buildings of the Szczecin Art Academy.
