= White Eagle Fountain =

Baroque fountain in Szczecin, Poland

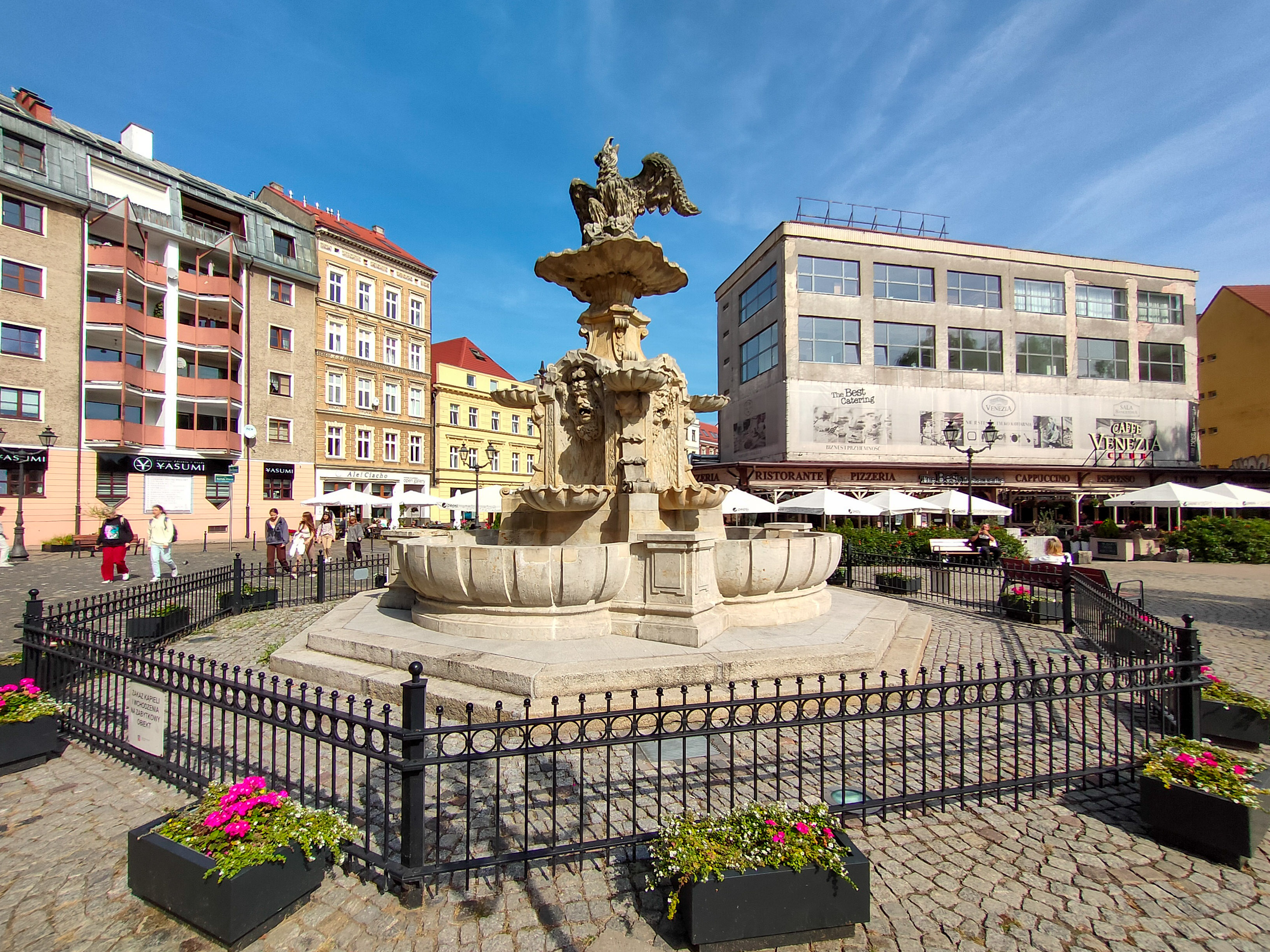
- The fountain in 2022.
- Artist: Johann Friedrich Grael (design); Johann Konrad Koch (sculpture)
- Year: 15 August 1732
- Type: Fountain
- Medium: Sandstone
- Movement: Baroque
- Location: Szczecin, Poland; 53°25′34.00″N 14°33′17.28″E

The White Eagle Fountain (Polish: Fontanna Orła Białego; German: Brunnen des Weißen Adlers), known until 1945 as the Horse Market Square Fountain (German: Brunnen auf dem Roßmarkt; Roßmarktbrunnen), is a Baroque sandstone fountain in Szczecin, Poland. It is placed at the White Eagle Square, in front of the Globe Palace, within the Old Town neighbourhood of the Downtown district. The fountain was designed by Johann Friedrich Grael, and sculptured by Johann Konrad Koch, and unveiled on 15 August 1732.

== History ==
The sandstone fountain was designed by Johann Friedrich Grael, and sculptured by Johann Konrad Koch and stonemason Angerer. It was commissioned by king Frederick William I of Prussia, together with the city water supply system, becoming its first functional element on 15 August 1732. It was placed at the White Eagle Square (then known as the Horse Market Square), next to tenements at 18 and 19 Koński Kierat Street. The fountain originally had its surface covered with polychrome, and it featured four sculptures of griffins, standing below the fountain bowl.

By the second half of 19th century, it had badly deteriorated, and was at risk of being removed. It was preserved and renovated thanks to efforts of James Hobrecht, the designer of the city water system.

It was moved between 1862 and 1866, to its current location, in front of the Grumbkow Palace (now replaced with Globe Palace), which was the residence of the chancellor and supreme president of the Province of Pomerania, Philipp Otto von Grumbkow. It was placed on a small platform with three-step staircase, and surrounded with a metal fence, which would eventually be removed in the 1930s.

During the Second World War, the fountain was buried in a mound of gravel to protect it from air raid bombings. It was reactivated in 1946.

It was renovated between 1990 and 1992, and again between 2005 and 2006. During the latter, the foundations of the fountain and its façade were restored. It was turned off in 2014, to preserve the object and not rist further weathering due to flowing water.

== Characteristics ==
The base of the Baroque sandstone fountain has a shape of a barbed quatrefoil. Its centre features a quadrangular pillar, with semicircular closed niches. Each side features a mascaron with water flowing out of their mouth into small bowls shaped like shells. At the top of the pillar is placed a large bowl with an eagle with spread wings, sitting on a pile of rock, which features several small lizards and turtles. Eagle has its head risen up with water flowing out of his open beak. It wears a crown. The spread wings were originally meant to symbolise Kings of Prussia protecting their subjects.

The fountain is placed at the White Eagle Square in front of the Globe Palace. It stands on a small elevation, and is surrounded by a black metal fence.

== Gallery ==
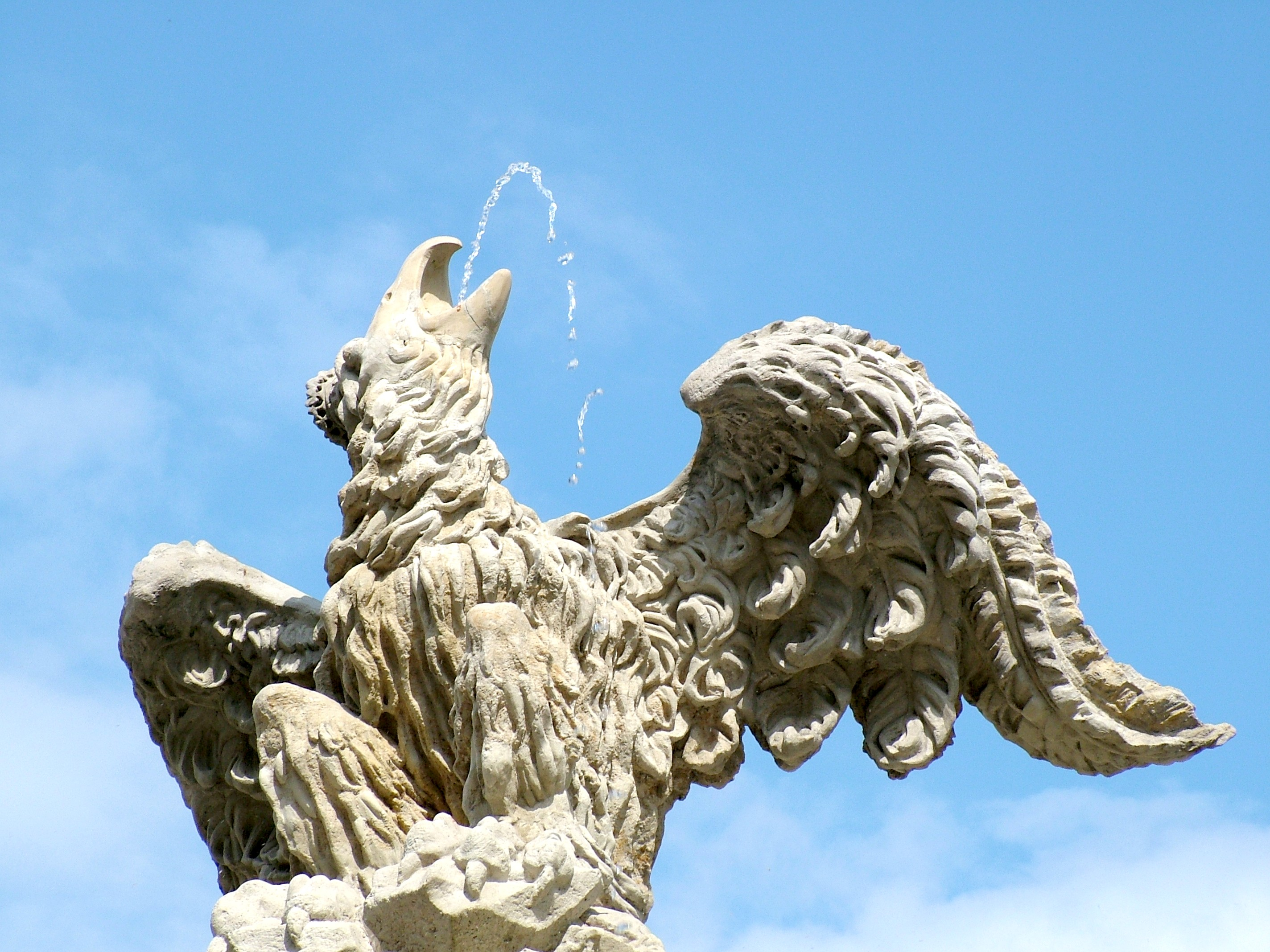
The sculpture of the eagle with flowing water

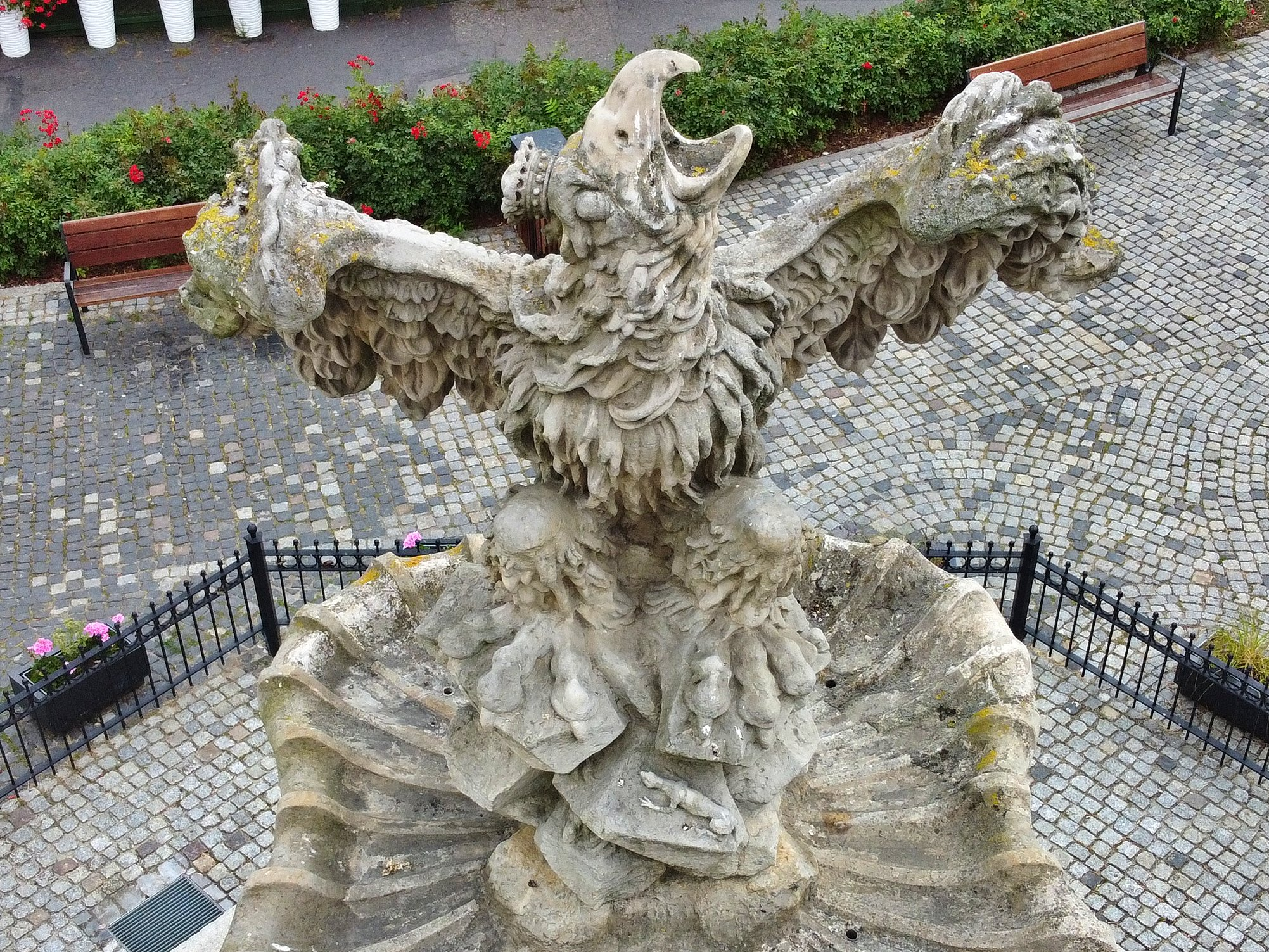
The sculpture of the eagle

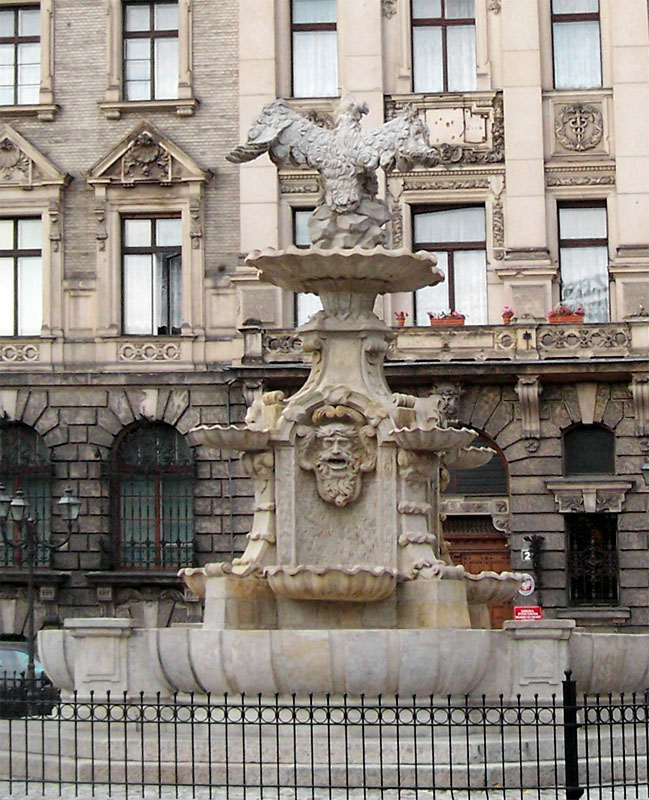
Back of the fountain
