= King's Gate (Szczecin) =

Historical city gate in Szczecin, Poland

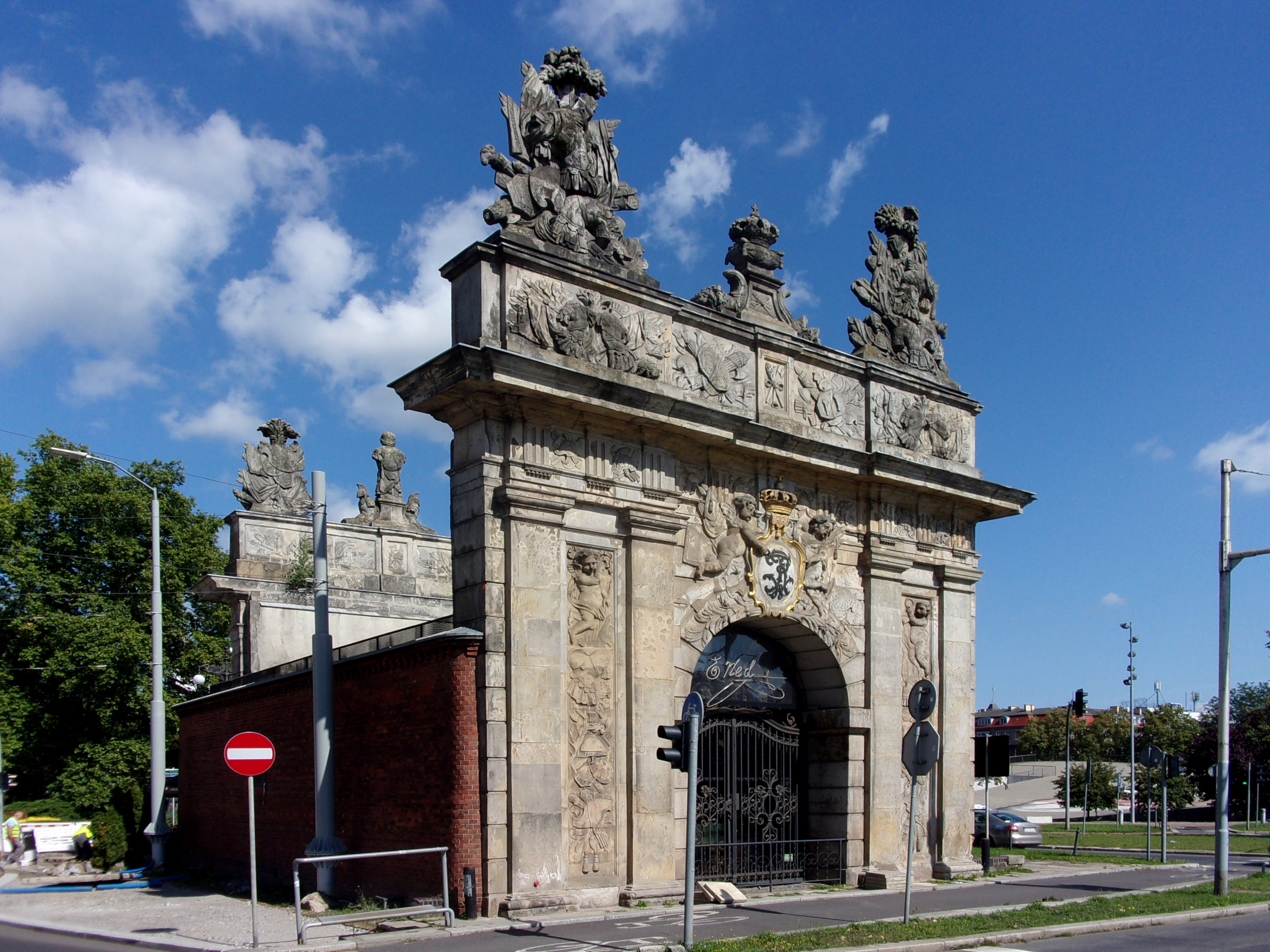
- The building in 2021.
- Interactive map of the King's Gate area

General information
- Type: City gate
- Architectural style: Baroque
- Location: Szczecin, Poland, 8 Prussian Homage Square
- Coordinates: 53°25′42.40″N 14°33′23.19″E
- Construction started: 1725
- Completed: 1728

Technical details
- Floor count: 1

Design and construction
- Architect: Gerhard Cornelius van Wallrawe
- Other designers: Bartholomé Damart; Hans Jürgen Reinecke; J.H. Trippel

The King's Gate (Polish: Brama Królewska; German: Königstor), formerly known as the Anklam Gate (Polish: Brama Anklamska, Brama Nakielska; German: Anklamer Tor), and sometimes also referred to as the Prussian Homage Gate (Polish: Brama Hołdu Pruskiego), is a historic Baroque city gate in Szczecin, Poland, located at the Prussian Homage Square (Polish: Plac Hołdu Pruskiego), at the intersection of Matejki Street and Polish Soldier Square. It was constructed between 1725 and 1728, with the project being designed by Gerhard Cornelius van Wallrawe, and its elaborate façade sculptures done by Bartholomé Damart. It served as the northern entrance to the city, and was part of the fortification walls, until 1841, when they were deconstructed. Currently, it houses a confectionery store.

== History ==
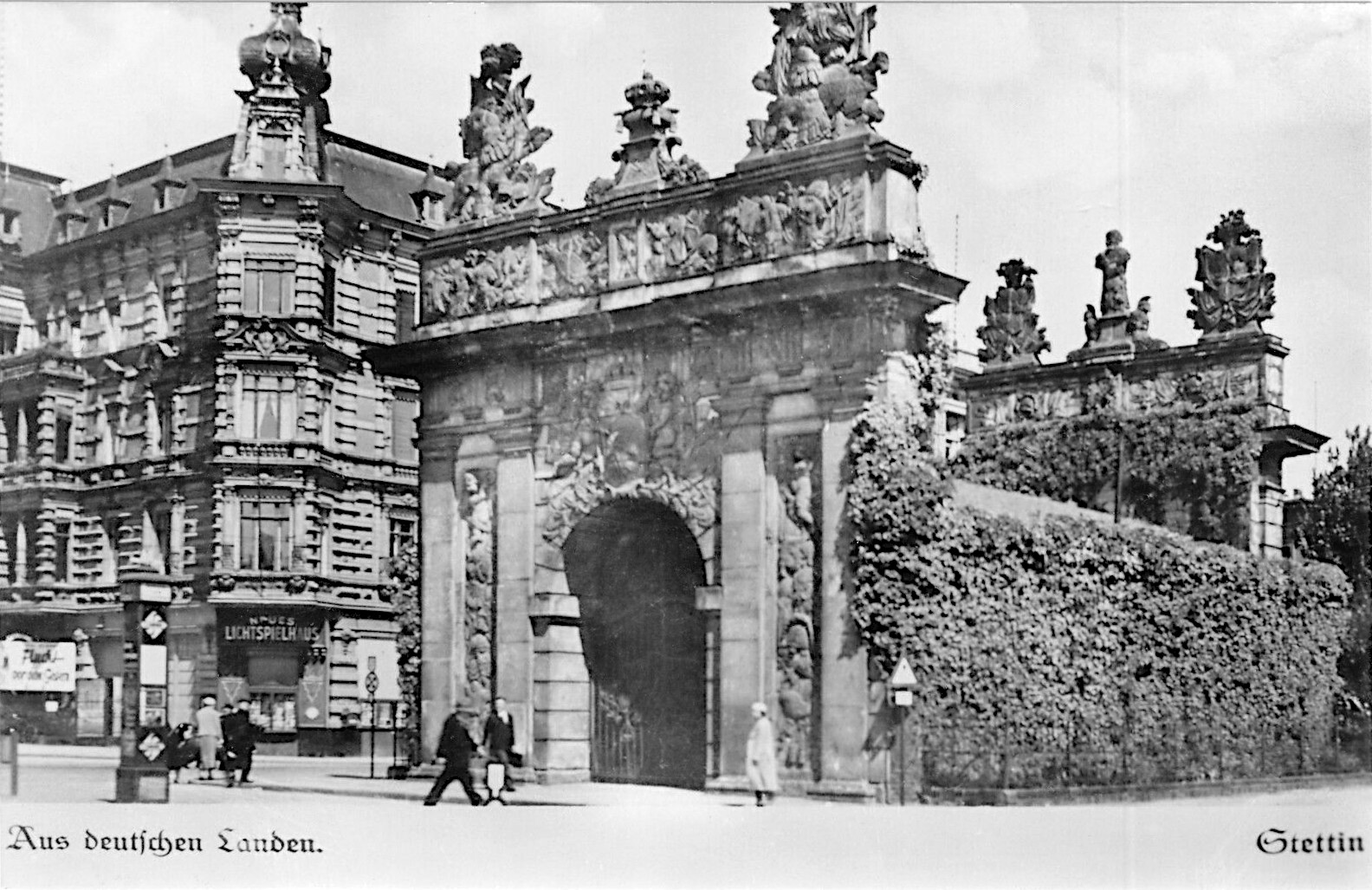
The gate in 1928.

The city gate was constructed between 1725 and 1728, as the northern entrance to the city, and part of the fortification walls. It was protected by the nearby Mill and Kagen bastions. The building was designed by military architect Gerhard Cornelius van Wallrawe. The masonry was done by Hans Jürgen Reinecke, stonemasonry by J.H. Trippel, and the façade sculptures by Bartholomé Damart. It was originally named the Anklam Gatem after the town of Anklam in Mecklenburg–Western Pomerania, Germany. It was renamed to the King's Gate, to commemorate visit of king Frederick William IV of Prussia in 1841. The fortification walls were removed in 1873, with King's Gate being preserved, and given to the city.

In 1942, during the Second World War, to protect the elaborate sculptures at the top of the gate, from the Allied bombing raids, they were taken down, and hidden in the Arkona Woods. They were reinstalled in 1957. The building itself was covered in ivy to hide it.

In 1954, the building received the status of a protected cultural property, being listed at the Prussian Homage Gate, referring to the homage of 1525, when the Duchy of Prussia became a fiefdom of the Kingdom of Poland.

From 1957 to 1986, in front of the gate stood the Statue of Flora, a Baroque sandstone sculpture dating to around 1730.

In 1999, at its west wall was installed a bronze commemorative plaque dedicated to Dezydery Chłapowski, a 19th-century military officer and general of the insurgents forces during the November and Greater Poland uprisings, as well as in the Polish Legions during the Napoleonic Wars. He was sentenced for his participation in the November Uprising, and jailed in the Fort Prussia in Szczecin, located near the gate.

The building was renovated and modernised in 1994. In the 1990s, it was used as an alt gallery, which in 2000 was replaced by a coffeehouse. Since 2017, it houses a confectionery store.

== Characteristics ==
The King's Gate is a historic Baroque city gate. It is a central object of the Prussian Homage Square (Polish: Plac Hołdu Pruskiego), placed near the intersection of Matejki Street and Polish Soldier Square. To its north is located the Solidarity Square.

It consists of two gates, connected by a long and wide corridor. Their façade feature elaborate ornamentation. The north gate includes a cartouche above the gate archways, featuring the coat of arms of Prussia, surrounded with the Order of the Black Eagle, and with the royal crown above it, placed at the backdrop of elaborate panoply. The attic above the cornice of the entablature features sculptures of Mars with a sword and a shield, and Hercules with a club and lion pelt. At the top are placed three large sculptures. The central depicts two tied prisoners of war, sitting on the sides a pedestal with a Roman armor displayed on top of it. To the sides are two sets of large panoplies, displaying captured armor and weaponry.

The south gate includes a cartouche with two putti, naked chubby child angels with wings, holding it. The attic and façade to the sides of the entrance, feature elaborate reliefs of panoply, depicting armour, weaponry, shields, and standards. On top are placed three sculptures, with the central depicting a royal crown, and two on its sides are large panoplies.

Its west wall features a bronze commemorative plaque dedicated to Dezydery Chłapowski, a 19th-century military officer and general of the insurgents forces during the November and Greater Poland uprisings, as well as in the Polish Legions during the Napoleonic Wars. He was sentenced for his participation in the November Uprising, and jailed in the Fort Prussia in Szczecin, located near the gate.

== Gallery ==
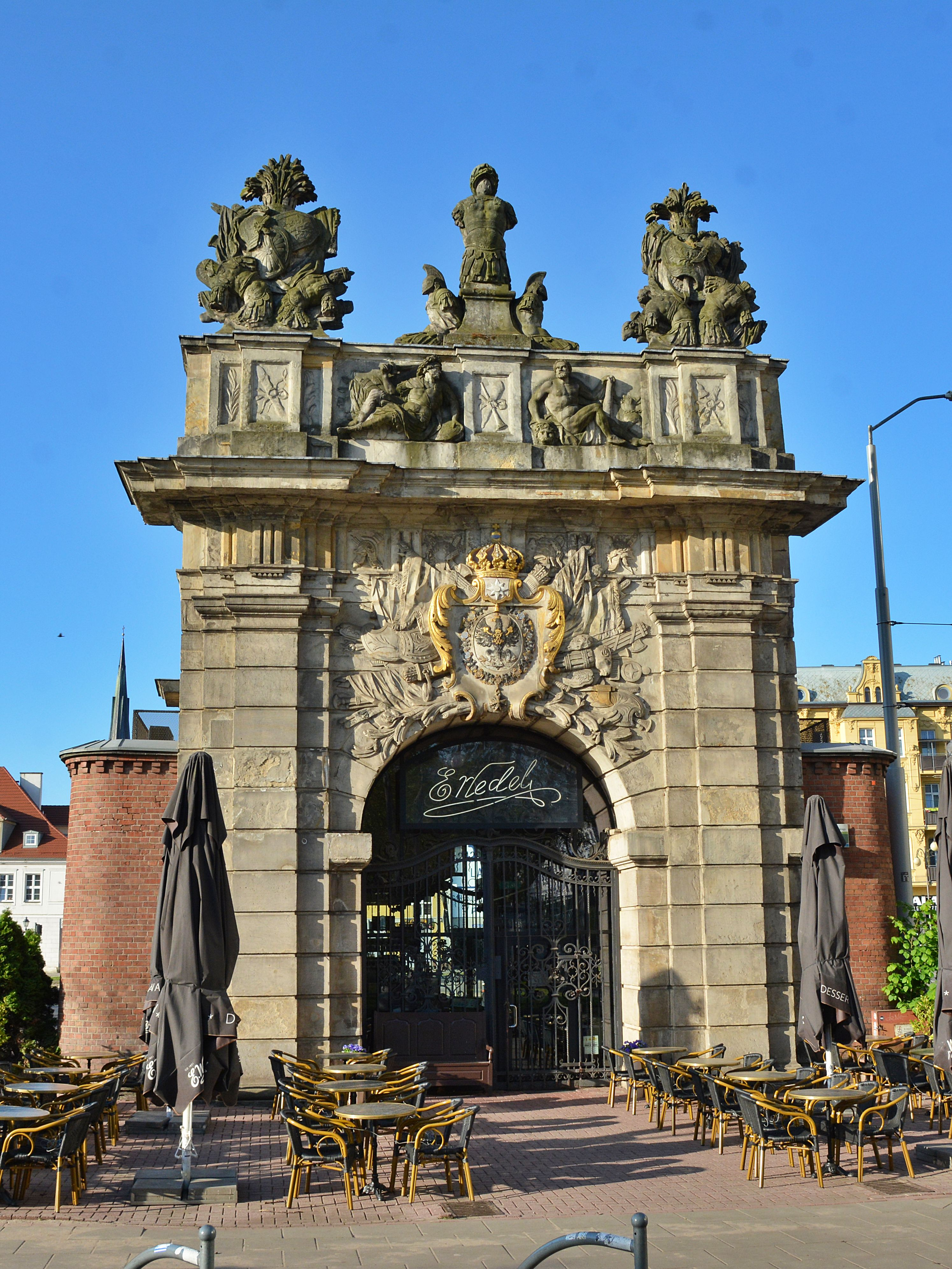
The north façade.

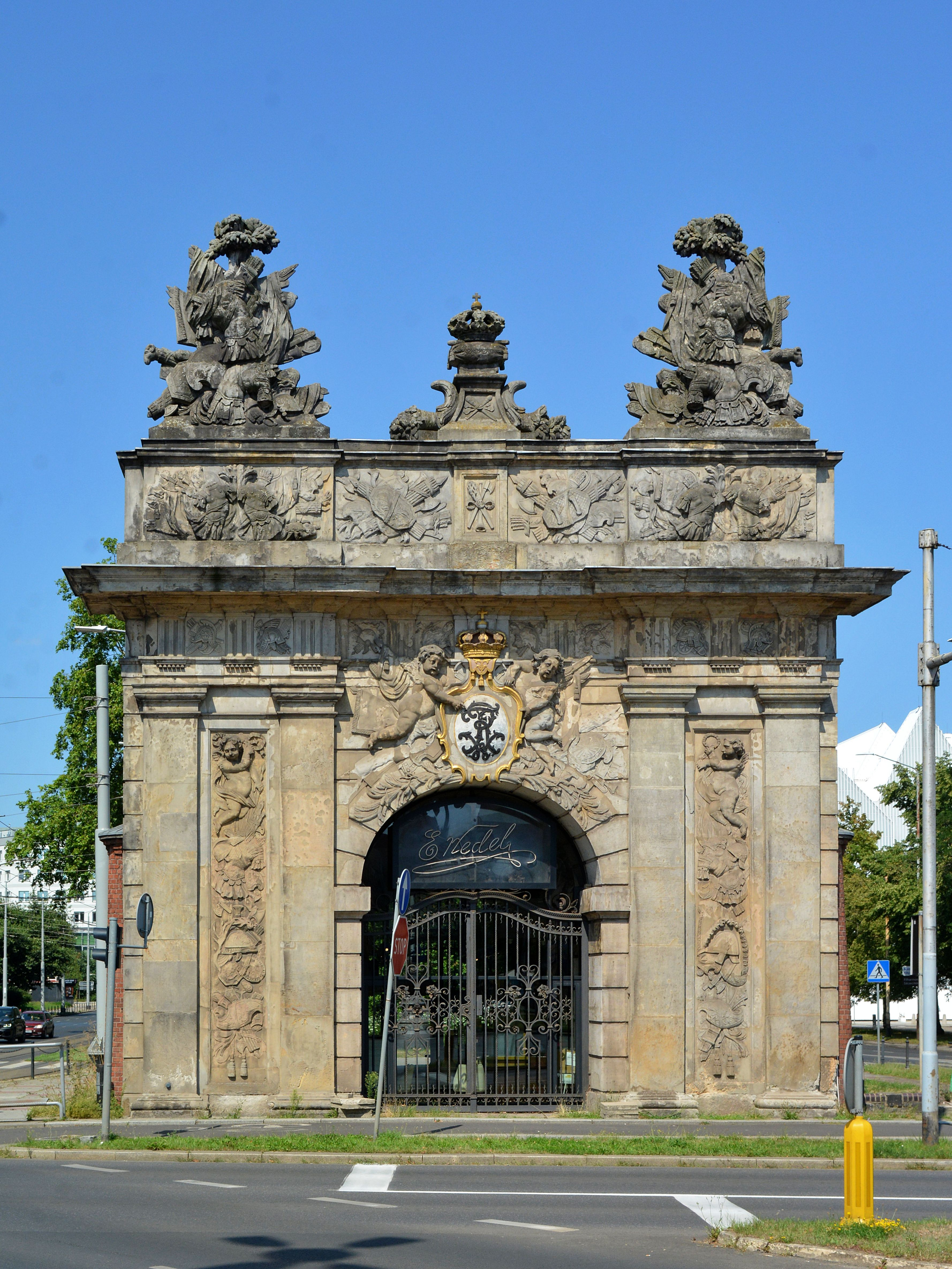
The south façade.
