= King's Gate (Hattusa) =

City gate of the Hittite capital Hattusa

Coordinates: 40°00′33.3″N 34°37′21.4″E

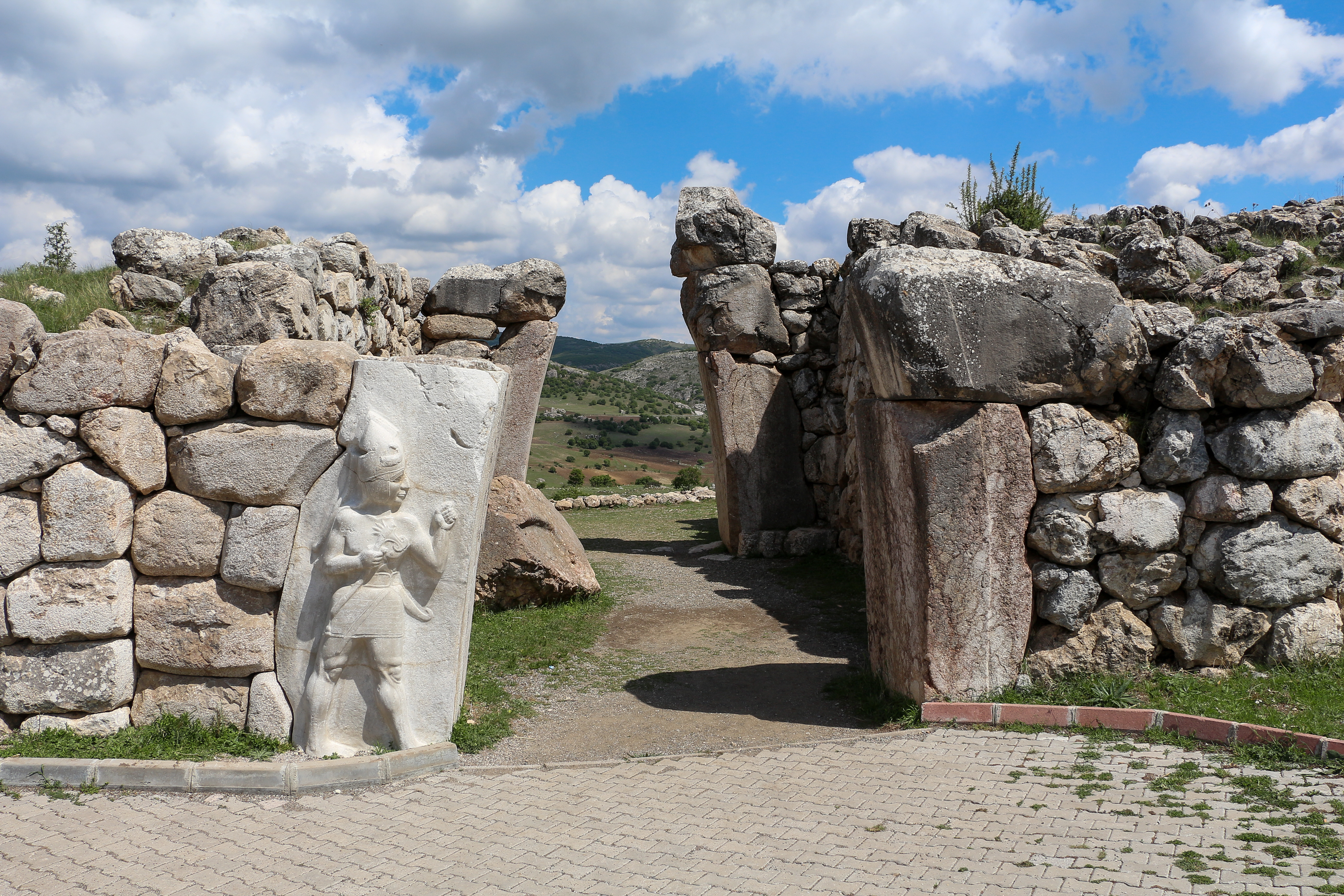
The King's Gate seen from the city side

The King's Gate is a monumental gate in the outer walls of Hattusa, the Hittite capital in Boğazkale District, Turkey. Its modern name comes from a relief of an armed figure on the side facing the city. The excavators interpreted the figure as a king. It may represent a god.

== Location ==
The gate stands in the southeast of Hattusa, in northern central Anatolia. Five gateways are known in the Upper City's fortifications. Besides the King's Gate, they include two western gates, the Lion Gate in the southwest and the Sphinx Gate to the south.

== Excavation and conservation ==
Carl Humann had recognised the gate's approximate location. Theodore Makridi identified it more precisely and partly excavated its front in 1906. Otto Puchstein and his colleagues completed the excavation in 1907.

The relief was cut from its block in 1907. The original is in the Museum of Anatolian Civilizations in Ankara. A copy was installed at the gate in 1967. A concrete replica replaced a deteriorated version in the mid-1990s.

== Description ==
=== Gate and approach ===
The gate consists of a chamber between two projecting towers. Its plan resembles that of the Lion Gate in reverse. The chamber measures 6.25 by 7.80 metres. Both towers are 14.80 metres deep. The southern tower is 9.70 metres wide and the northern one 10.40 metres wide. Parts of their walls survived to a height of 4.50 metres when excavated. The stonework ranges from rough rubble in the concealed walls to more closely fitted blocks on the visible faces, including polygonal masonry. On the city side, pilasters mark the corners and the middle of each tower.

Each end of the chamber had a parabolic arched opening, about 3.25 metres wide at the base and five metres high. The sides were made from large single blocks, with two courses of corbelled stonework above them, each projecting inwards. Dowels joined the stone blocks, including a bronze one recorded at the outer doorway.

Both openings had double doors that swung into the chamber. The door pivots turned in shallow circular sockets in stone blocks beside the jambs. The outer threshold bears scrape marks from the heavy wooden doors. Holes in the side walls held wooden bars that secured the outer doors from within.

Outside the gate, a ramp approached from the south, supported by a retaining wall. The ramp climbed steeply beside the outer city wall. Fortifications on the valley side included a bastion, allowing defenders to attack an approaching enemy from both sides. These outer works are better preserved and reconstructed than those at the Lion Gate.

=== Relief ===
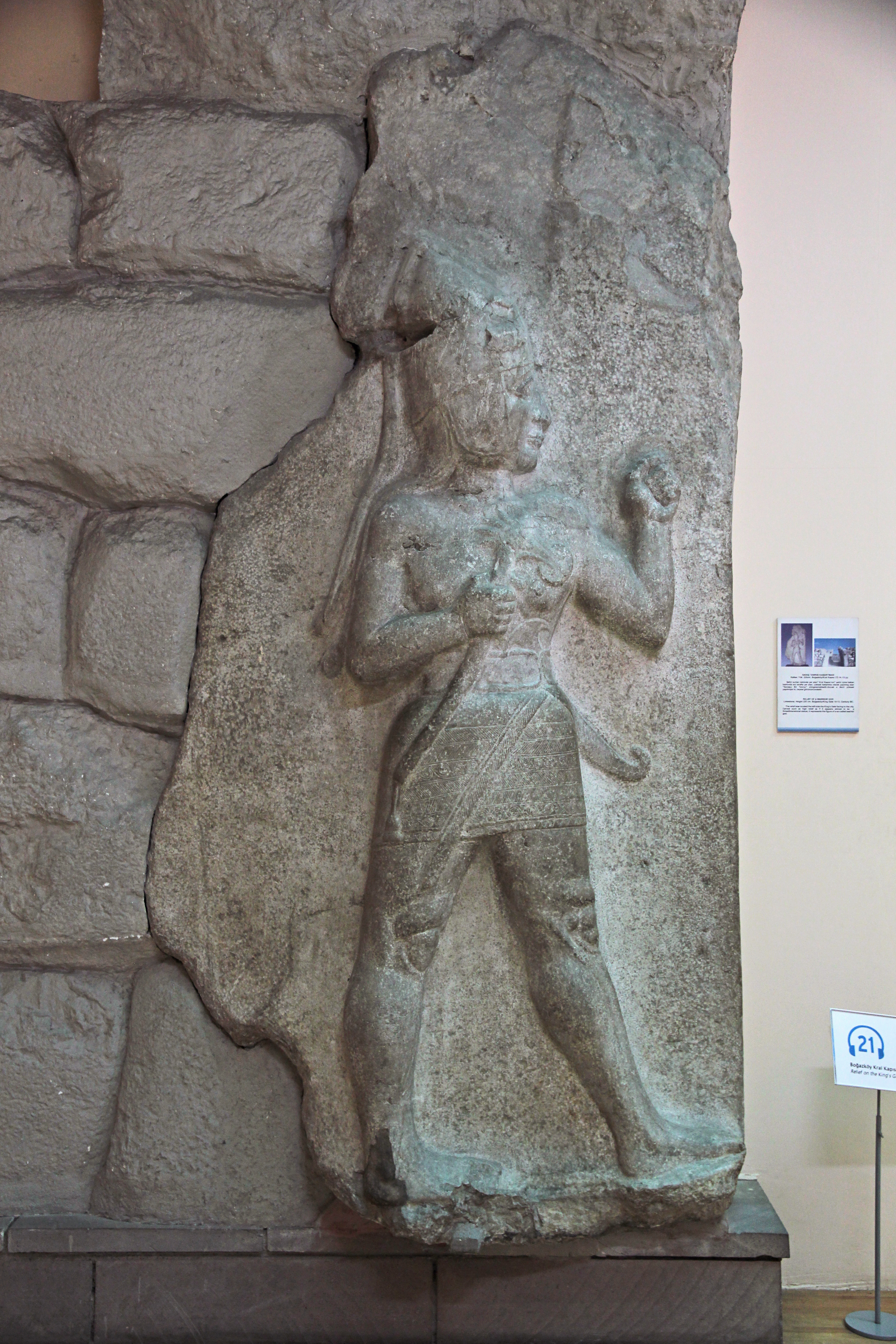
The original relief in the Museum of Anatolian Civilizations

The relief was carved on the northern jamb of the inner opening, facing the city. It shows a standing young warrior turned to the right. The figure is slightly larger than life, measuring 2.25 metres to the tip of the helmet. It is barefoot and beardless, with long hair falling over the shoulders. Its clothing consists of a short skirt held by a broad belt and a pointed helmet.

The skirt has an engraved pattern, with a fringed band hanging diagonally across the front. A short sword or dagger is tucked into the belt on the left. Its crescent-shaped pommel projects above the belt, while the scabbard ends in a hooked tip. The right hand holds an axe in front of the chest. The axe has a curved blade, four projecting points at the back and a tassel hanging from its handle. The helmet has ear flaps and a neck guard, with a curved horn at the front. Parts of the relief project as much as 17 centimetres from the background, and the lower legs are carved almost in the round. The chest hair is indicated by fine engraved lines.

The figure's identity was disputed after its discovery. According to Puchstein, Miss Dodd of the American girls' school in Constantinople thought that it represented a woman wearing a fur jacket. Archibald Sayce, William Mitchell Ramsay and John Garstang supported an interpretation as an Amazon. Puchstein maintained that the figure was male and that the supposed fur was body hair. He considered it a representation of the king who had built the gate and city walls.

The horn on the helmet is a divine attribute, which supports identifying the figure as a god. Jürgen Seeher suggested that it could represent Sharrumma, the patron and protector of Tudḫaliya IV.

=== Date ===
The date of the gate's construction is uncertain. The King's Gate and Lion Gate stand at slight angles to the city wall. This may indicate that they were added after the wall was built.

For the Lion Gate, Rudolf Naumann argued that its unfinished outer face showed that work had stopped when the Hittite Empire collapsed. This would place its construction in the 13th century BC. Andreas Schachner suggested that work might instead have stopped when Muwatalli II moved the capital to Tarhuntassa in the first third of the 13th century BC. On that reading, the Lion Gate would have been built in the 14th century BC, possibly towards its end.

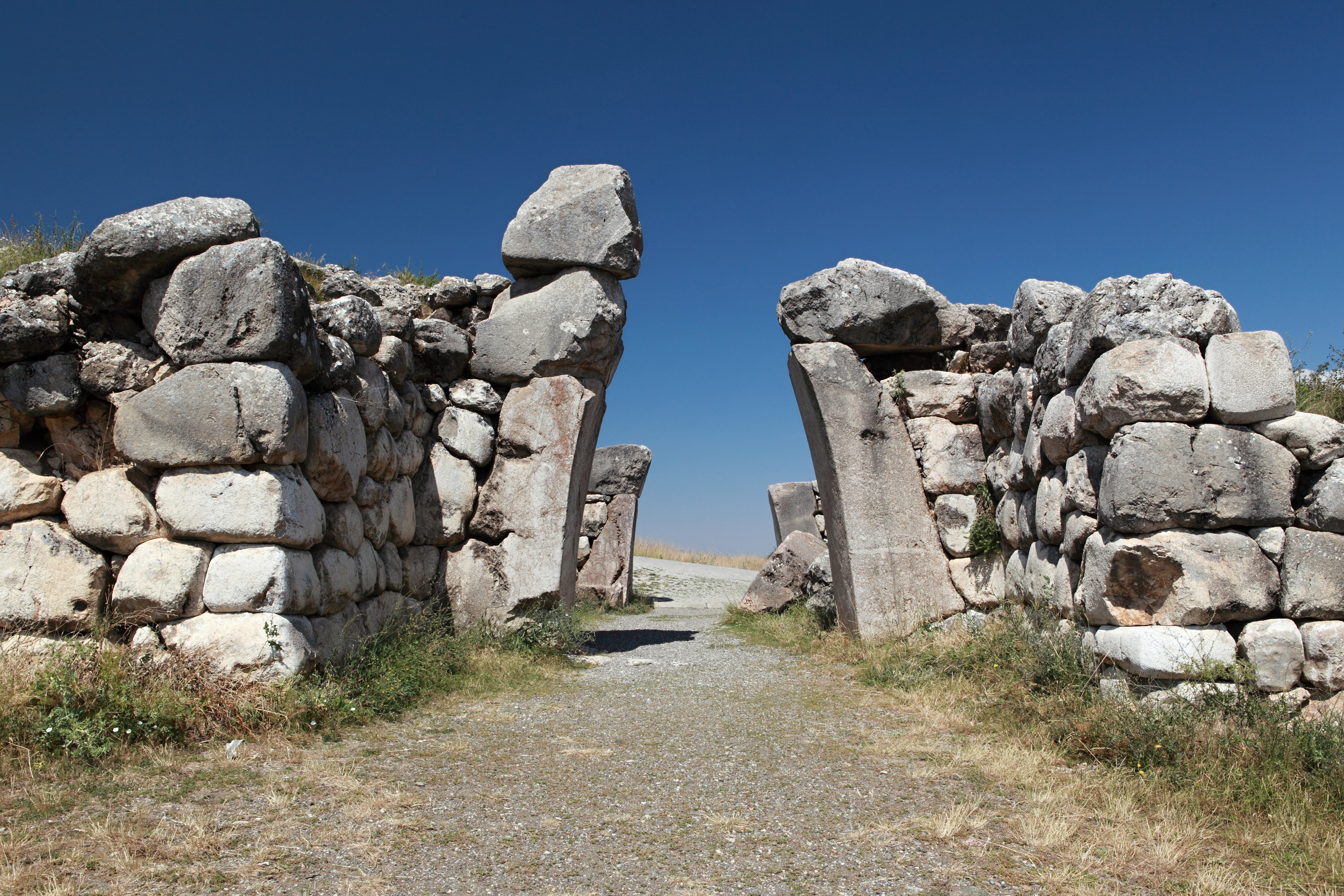
The outer side of the gate

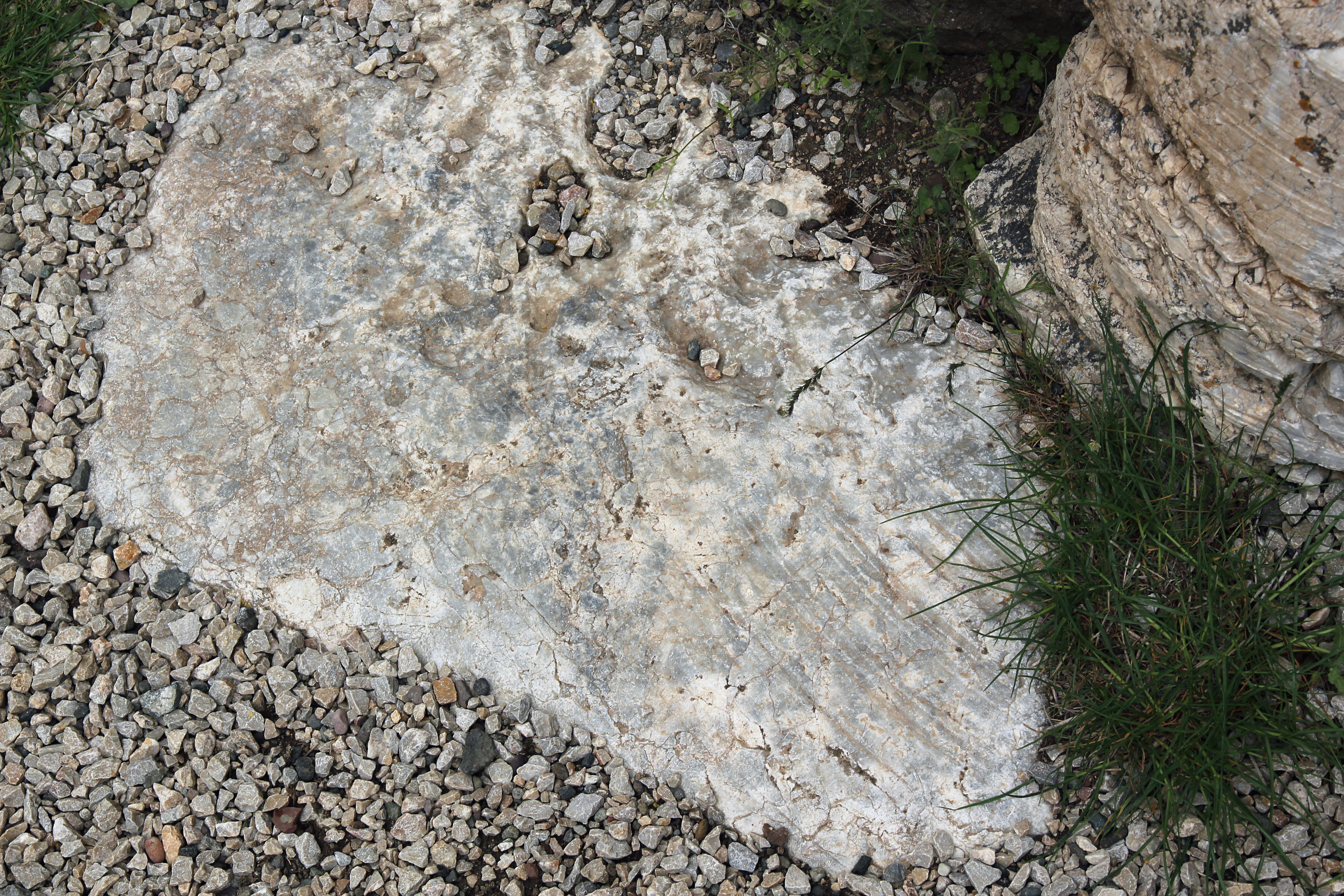
Wear marks left by the doors

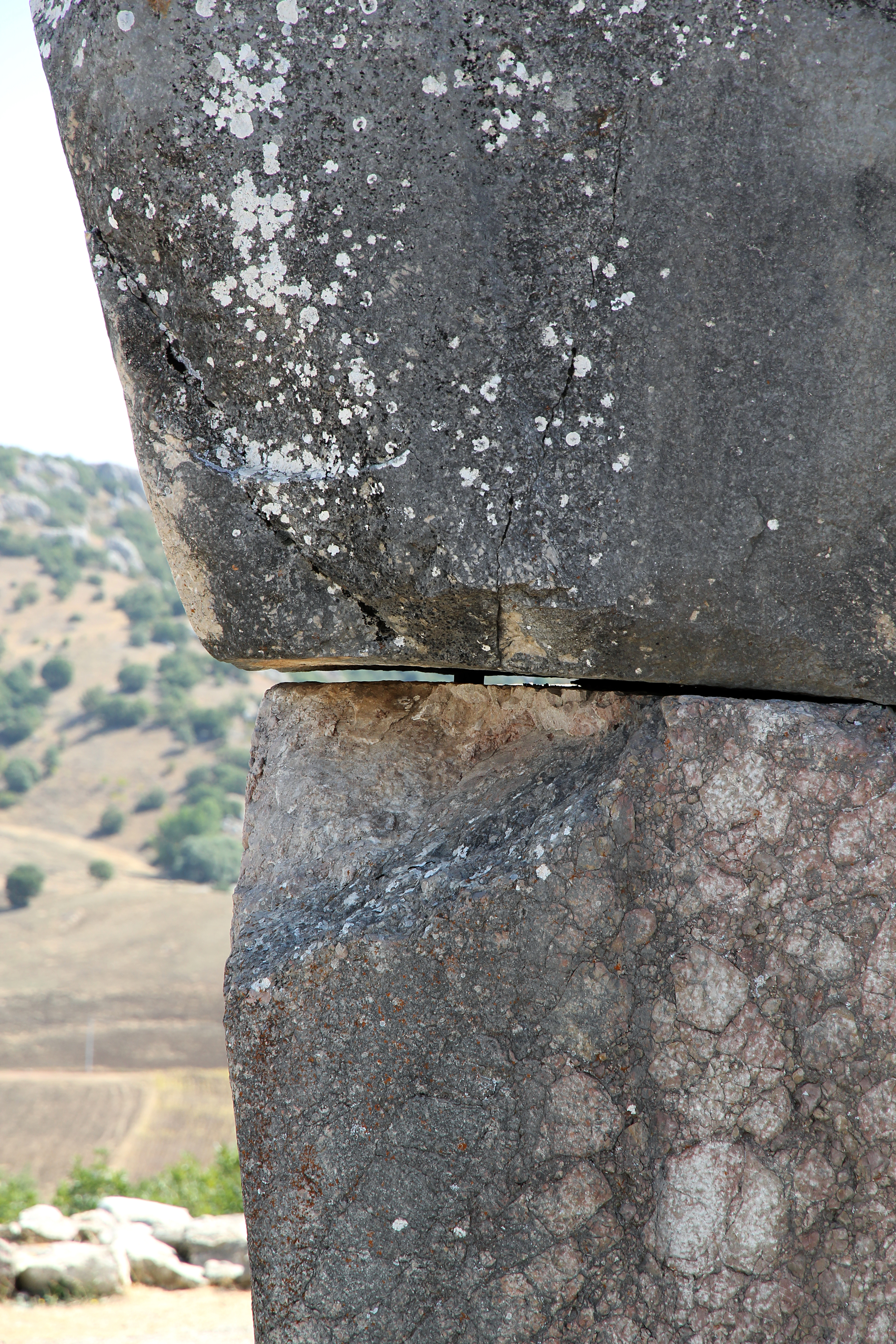
A dowel between doorway blocks

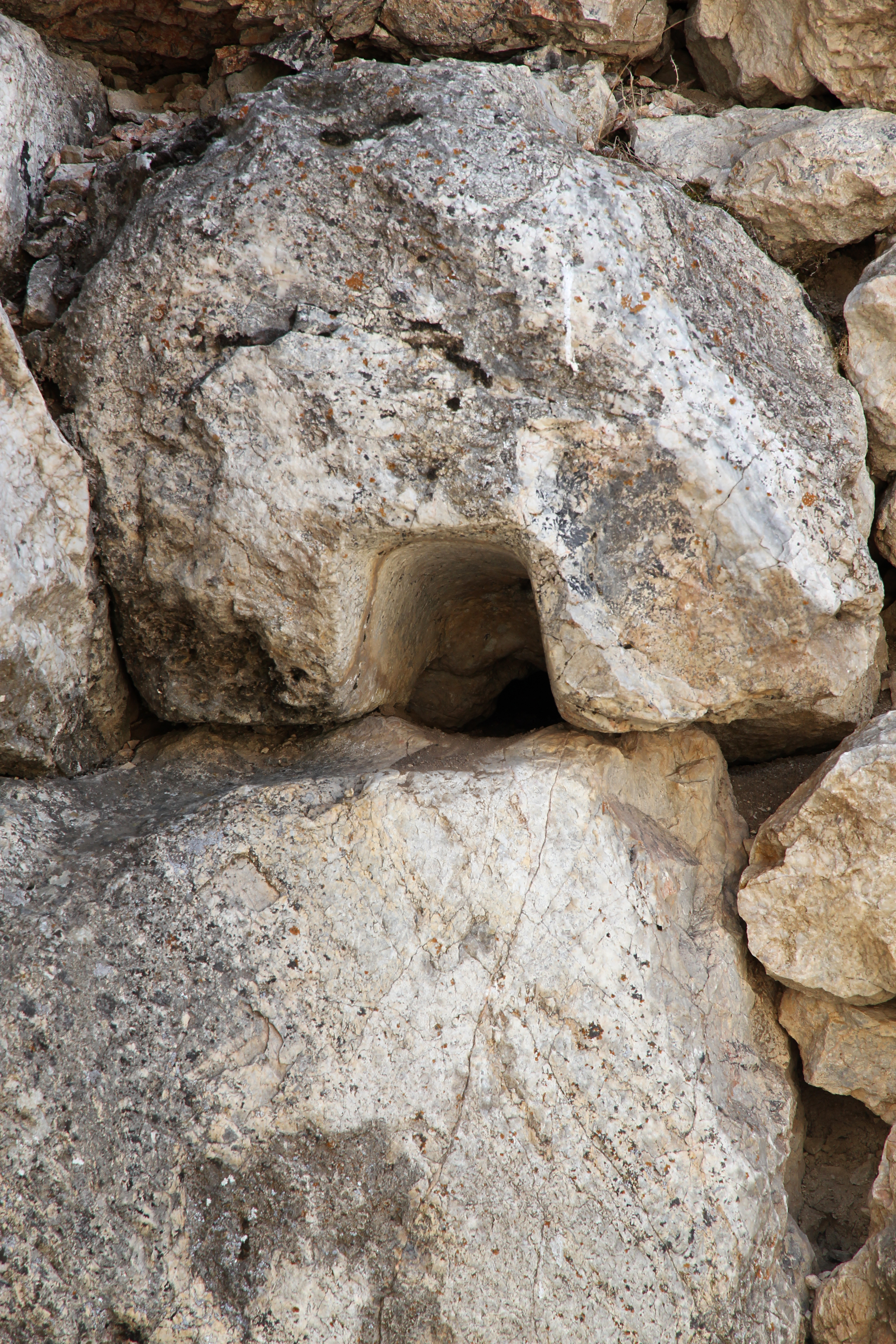
A socket for a locking bar

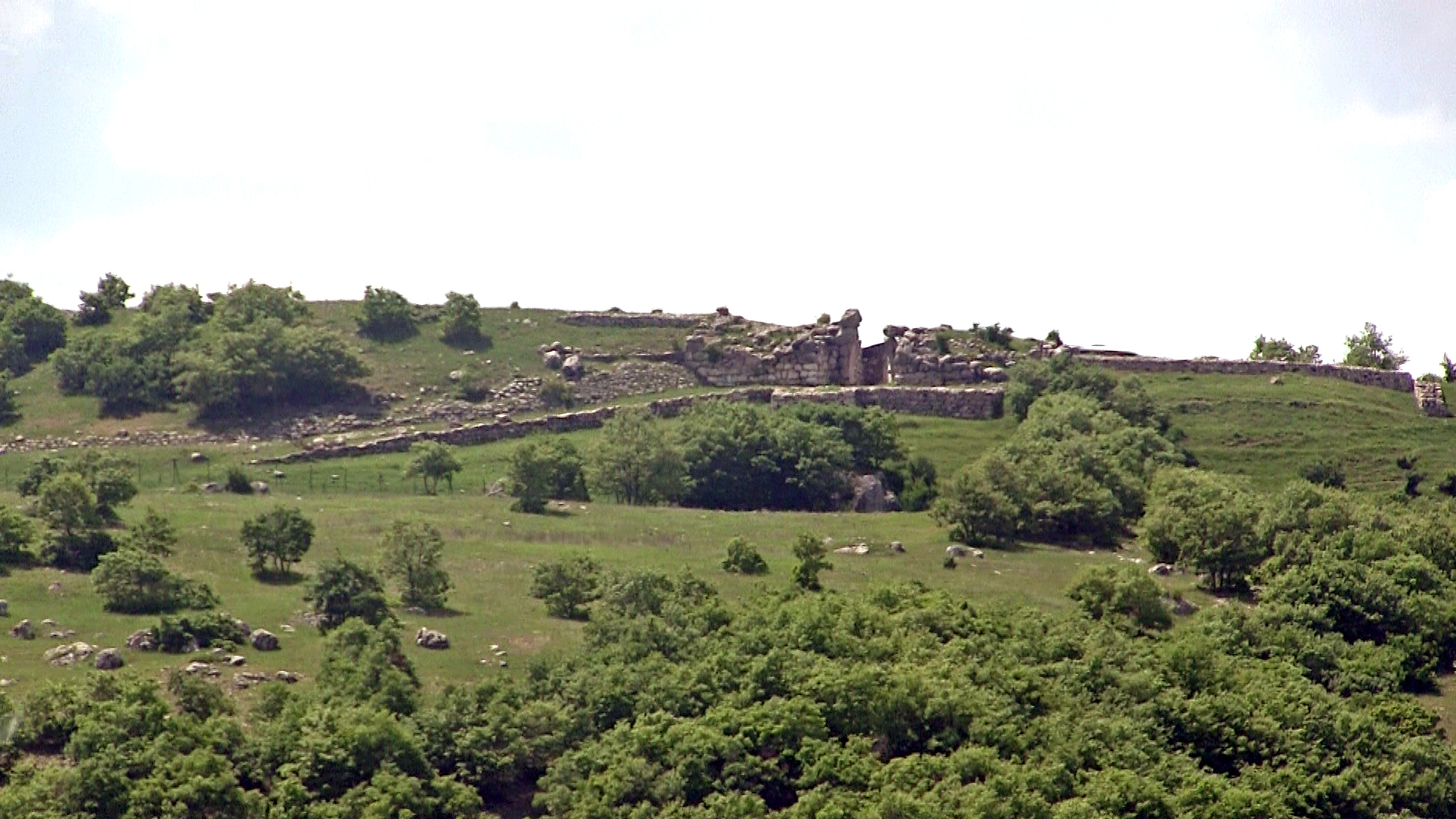
The gate complex seen from outside
