= Aguila Blanca =

Aguila Blanca may refer to:

- The White Eagle (1941 film), an Argentine film
- José "Aguila Blanca" Maldonado Román (1874–1932), Puerto Rican revolutionary and outlaw
- Mantled hawk (Leucopternis polionotus), a species of bird of prey in the family Accipitridae
- Aguila Blanca (meteorite)
- Águila Blanca (heist), a robbery of a Wells Fargo depot by Los Macheteros, a guerrilla group seeking Puerto Rican independence
- Águilas Blancas, an American football team of the National Polytechnic Institute, Mexico
