= White Eagle Square =

Urban square in Warsaw, Poland

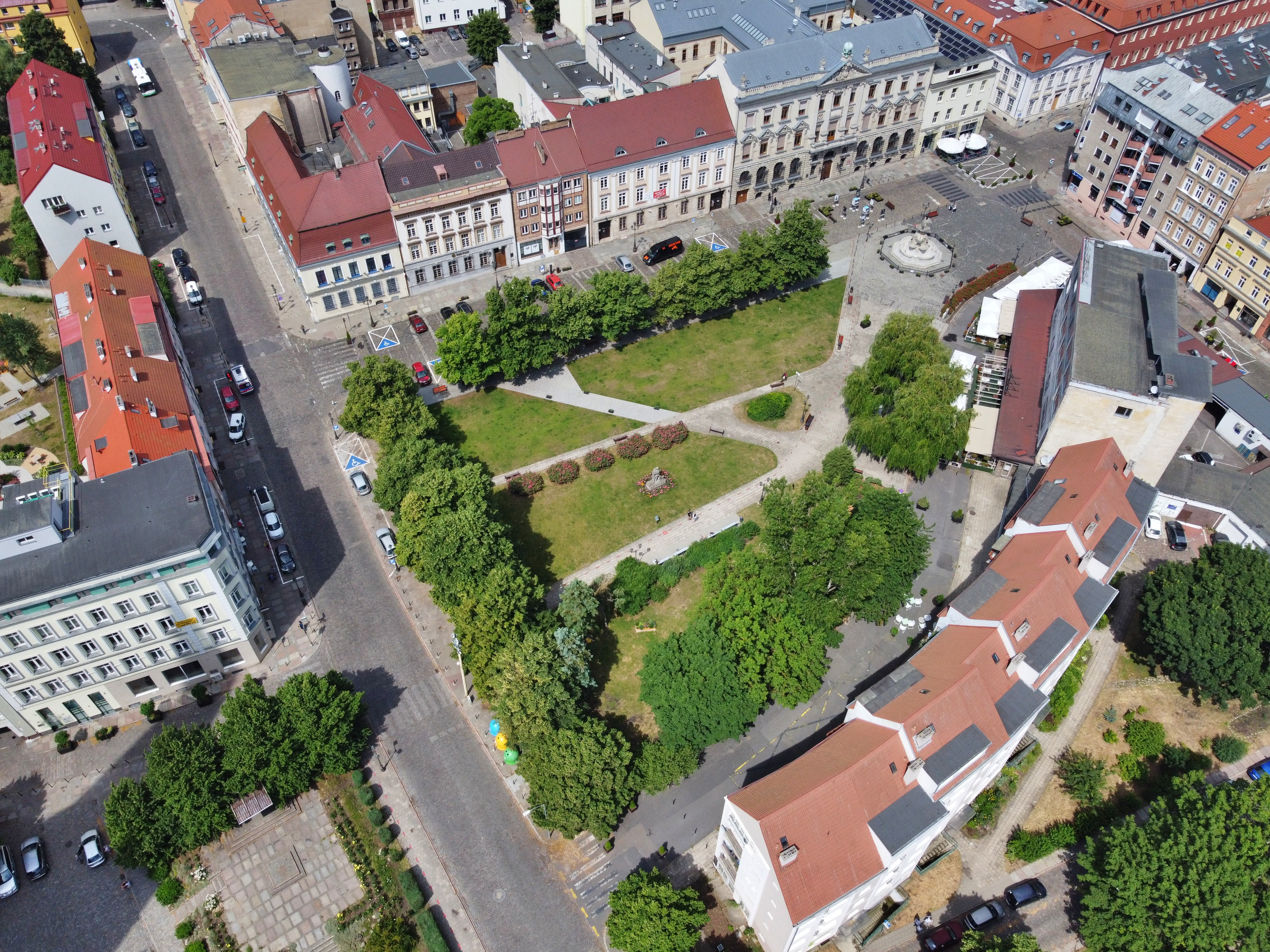
- The White Eagle Square in 2021.

- Location within Poland
- Type: Urban square
- Location: Szczecin, Poland
- Coordinates: 53°25′32.4″N 14°33′18.2″E
- North: Koński Kierat Street
- East: Bogdanki Street
- South: Grodzka Street
- West: Staromłyńska Street

The White Eagle Square (Polish: Plac Orła Białego; German: Weißen Adlers Platz), prior to 1945 known as the Horse Market Square (Polish: Rynek Koński; German: Roßmarkt), is an urban square in Szczecin, Poland, within the Old Town neighbourhood of the Downtown district. It is located between Koński Kierat, Bogdanki, Grodzka, and Staromłyńska Streets. It is surrounded by historic tenement houses and apartment buildings, including Globe and Ionic Palaces dating to the 18th century, and 1891, respectily, and features 18th-century sculptures of the White Eagle Fountain and the Statue of Flora. Until 18th century, it functioned as a marketplace, which existence was recorded as far back as the 12th century.

== Toponomy ==
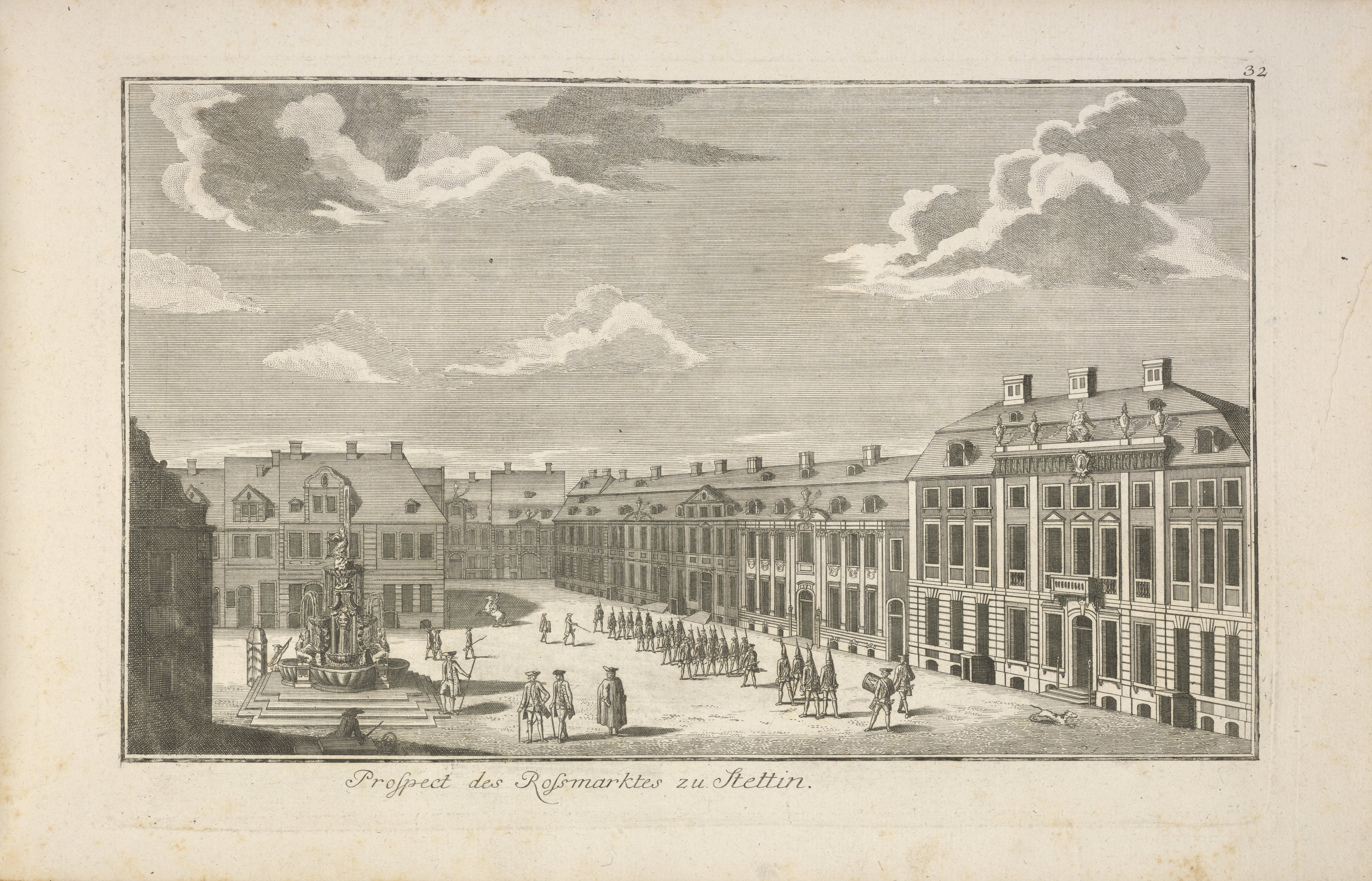
The illustration depicting the White Eagle Square (then the Horse Market Square) in the 18th century.

The White Eagle Square (Polish: Plac Orła Białego) was named after the coat of arms of Poland, featuring a white eagle in a red shield. The location itself features the White Eagle Fountain, a sculpture from 1732, which, while originally designed to depict a black eagle from the coat of arms of Prussia, was renamed to represent Polish iconography instead after 1945. Prior to this, the location was known as the Horse Market Square (German: Roßmarkt), after the horse trade that took place there. The name was recorded in Latin as such as far back as the second half of the 14th century. Prior to this, it was by 1206 and 1312, it was recorded as Latin as forum novum, meaning the New Market Square, in contrast to the Hay Market Square, then known as the Old Market Place.

== History ==
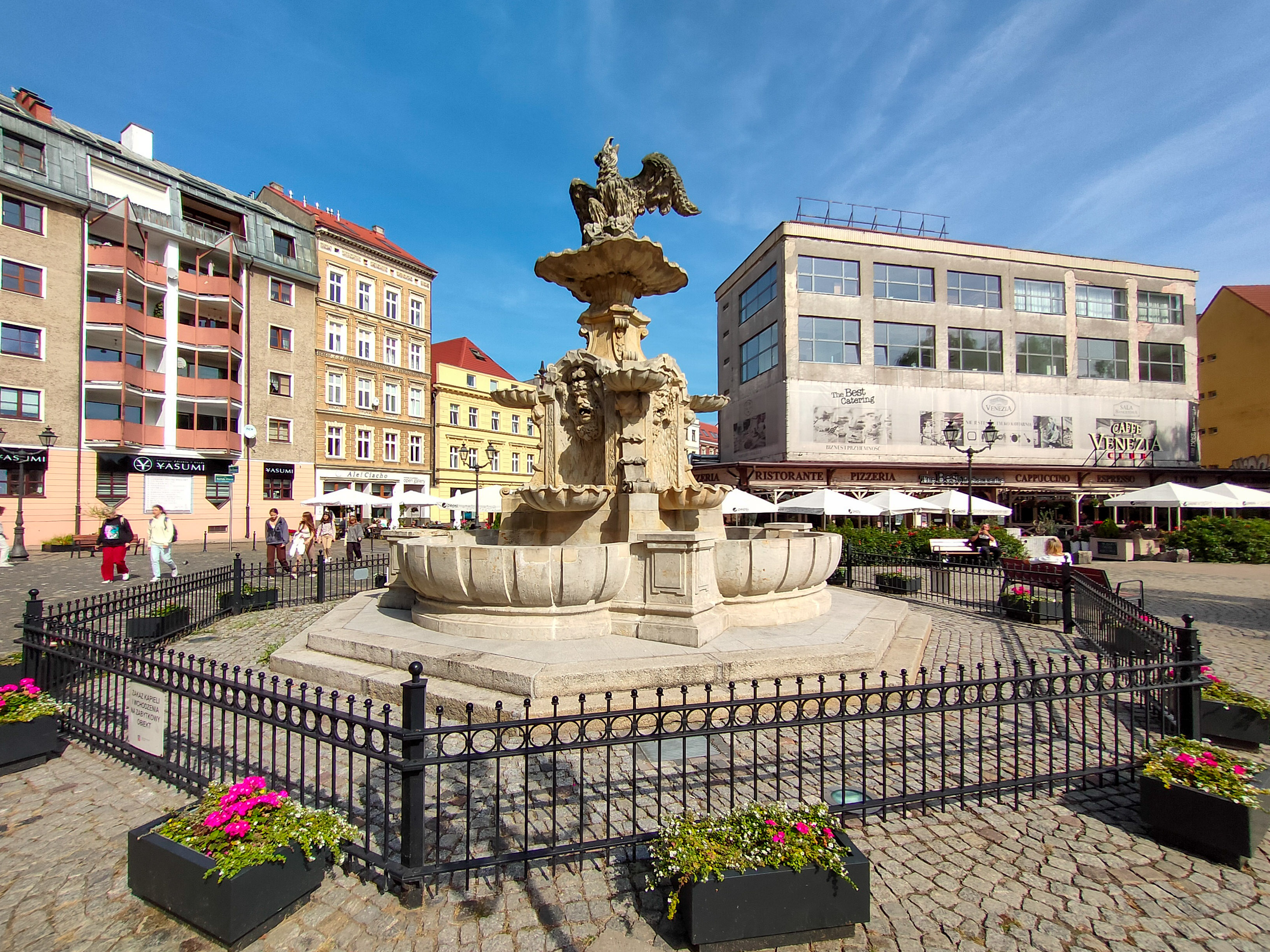
The White Eagle Fountain dating to 1732.

The square was developed as a marketplace for the Upper Town of Stettin. At its boundaries stood the Upper Town Hall (also known as the Small Town Hall), and the cloth hall with trading stalls. In 1306 and 1312, its name was recorded in Latin as forum novum, meaning the New Market Square. In the second half of the 14th century, it was mentioned with the Latin name forum equorum, meaning the Horse Market Square, referring to the horse trade that took place there. The cloth hall was deconstructed in the 16th century, and replaced with small tenement houses, while in place of the town hall, was built a horse mill.

In the 17th century, the buildings around the square were destroyed during the Thirty Years' War, and in the aftermath of the city's capture by the Prussian army in 1713, during the Great Northern War. Soon after, their ruins were cleaned up, and replaced with new neoclassical tenement houses. The row at the square's western side included the Ionic Palace, as well as the Grumbkow Palace. The latter was built in 1724, as the residence of the chancellor and supreme president of the Province of Pomerania, Philipp Otto von Grumbkow. In 1959, it became the birthplace of Maria Feodorovna, the Empress consort of Russia from 1796 to 1801.

On 15 August 1732, at the square was unveiled the White Eagle Fountain, becoming the first element of the water supply system. Made from sandstone, it was designed by Johann Friedrich Grael and sculpted by Johann Konrad Koch and stonemason Angerer and consists of a sculpture of an eagle placed on an elaborate pedestal, within a fountain basin. It was originally placed next to tenements at 18 and 19 Koński Kierat Street, and between 1862 and 1866, to its current location, in front of the Grumbkow Palace.

The White Eagle Square (then the Horse Market Square) before 1909.

In 1879, two horsecar lines connecting the Downtown to the neighbourhoods of Pogodno (then Nue Westend), and Golęcino (then Frauendorf), respectively. In 1897, they were replaced with electric trams, and in 1905, the lines received numbers 4 and 7. The both of them crossed the square, with the tracks installed in the street on its west side. In 1912, the line to Pogodno changed its route, omitting the square, while the other line operated until 1943, when, due to aerial bombings in Second World War, the tram network was shut down. After the war, the tracks were removed from the square.

In 1891, the Grumbkow Palace was replaced with a Baroque Revival building of the insurance company National, later known as the Globe Palace.

Between 1910 and 1912, tenement houses at the square's eastern side were demolished, and in their place, was constructed a Art Nouveau department store building owned by the company Eisenwarenhandlung Trompetter & Geck.

A portion of the square was destroyed in aerial bombings during the Second World War. The destruction included tenement houses on its north and east sides, as well as the department store building. The White Eagle Fountain, as well as the buildings on the west and north sides, survived the conflict. After the city was placed under the Polish administration in 1945, the location was renamed to the White Eagle Square, referring to the coat of arms of Poland, featuring a white eagle in a red shield. It was expanded with a garden square to the area of the destroyed tenement buildings at its south side. The remaining parcels were left undeveloped until the 1960s, when in their place, was built an apartment building. Around that time was also rebuilt the former building of the department store, redeveloped in a modernist style, for a car store, owned by the state-run company Polmozbyt. In 2010, it was replaced by restaurants.

In 1991, at the garden square was placed the Statue of Flora, a Baroque sandstone sculpture dating to around 1730. In the 1990s, in a small gap between buildings on the west side, was built a tenement house, under the address number 4, as well as an apartment building on the north side.

In 2010, the Globe Palace begun housing the Szczecin Art Academy. In 2021, it also begun using the neighbouring Ionic Palace.

In 2024, during the renovation works, a brick water canal with a length of 30 m, was as unearthed at the square. It is estimated to date to the 18th century.

== Overview ==
The White Eagle Square borders Koński Kierat Street to the north, Bogdanki Street to the east, Grodzka Street to the south, and Staromłyńska Street to the west. To the north and east, it was surrounded by tenement houses, mostly built in neoclassical and Baroque Revival style, with some dating to the 18th century. This includes the Globe and Ionic Palaces, dating to the 18th century, and 1891 respectively, which currently house the Szczecin Art Academy. To the south and west, it borders apartment buildings from the 1960s and 1990s, as well as a historic department store building, now adapted to host restaurants. Majority of the area consists of a garden square, with a small plaza in the northwest corner, which includes the White Eagle Fountaint, a sandstone sculpture from 1732, consisting of a statue of an eagle, placed on an elaborate pedestal, within a fountain basin. The square also includes the Statue of Flora, a Baroque sandstone sculpture dating to around 1730.

== Gallery ==
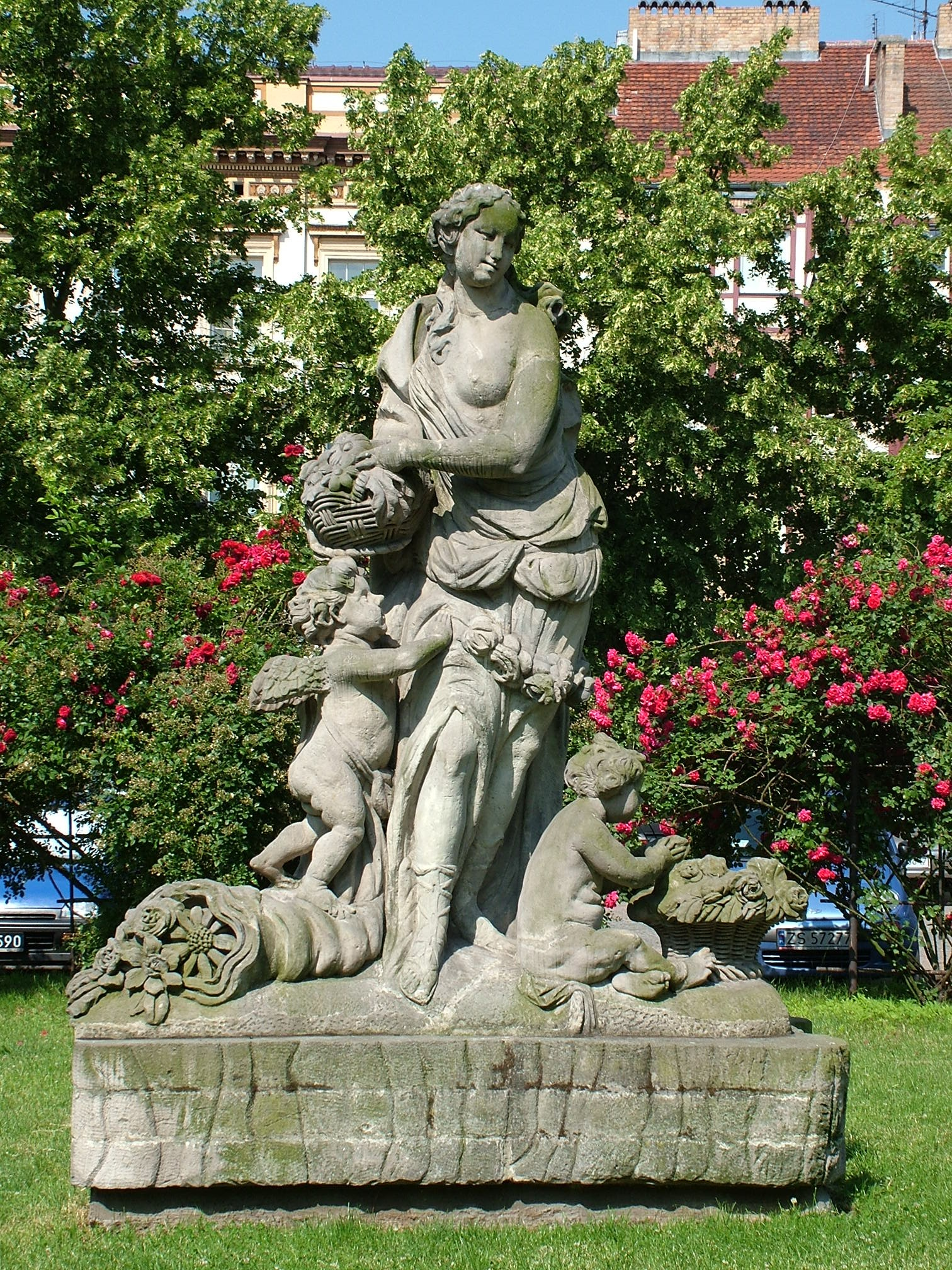
The Statue of Flora at the White Eagle Square, dating to around 1730.

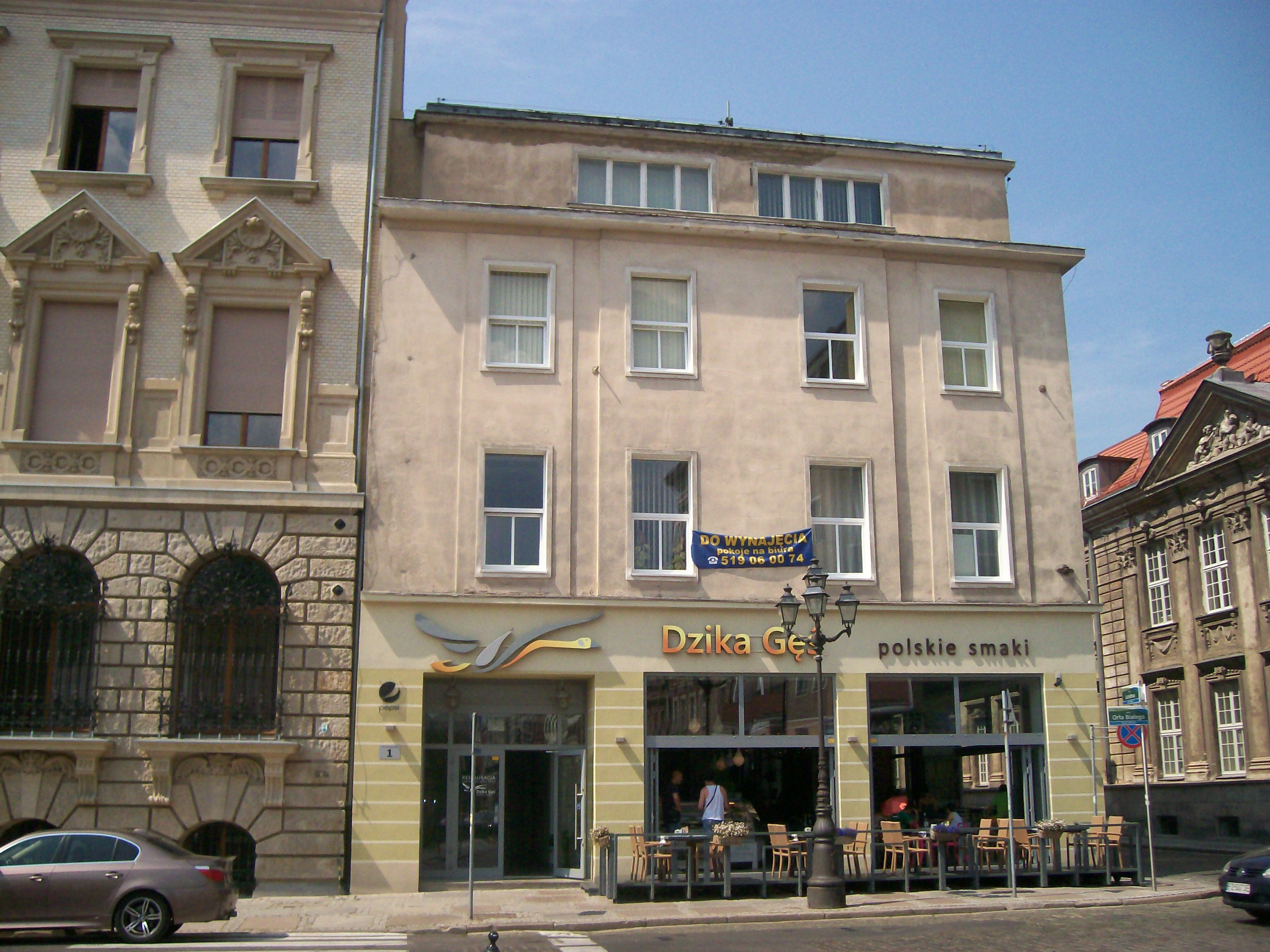
The modernist tenement house at 1 White Eagle Square, alongside Staromłyńska Street.

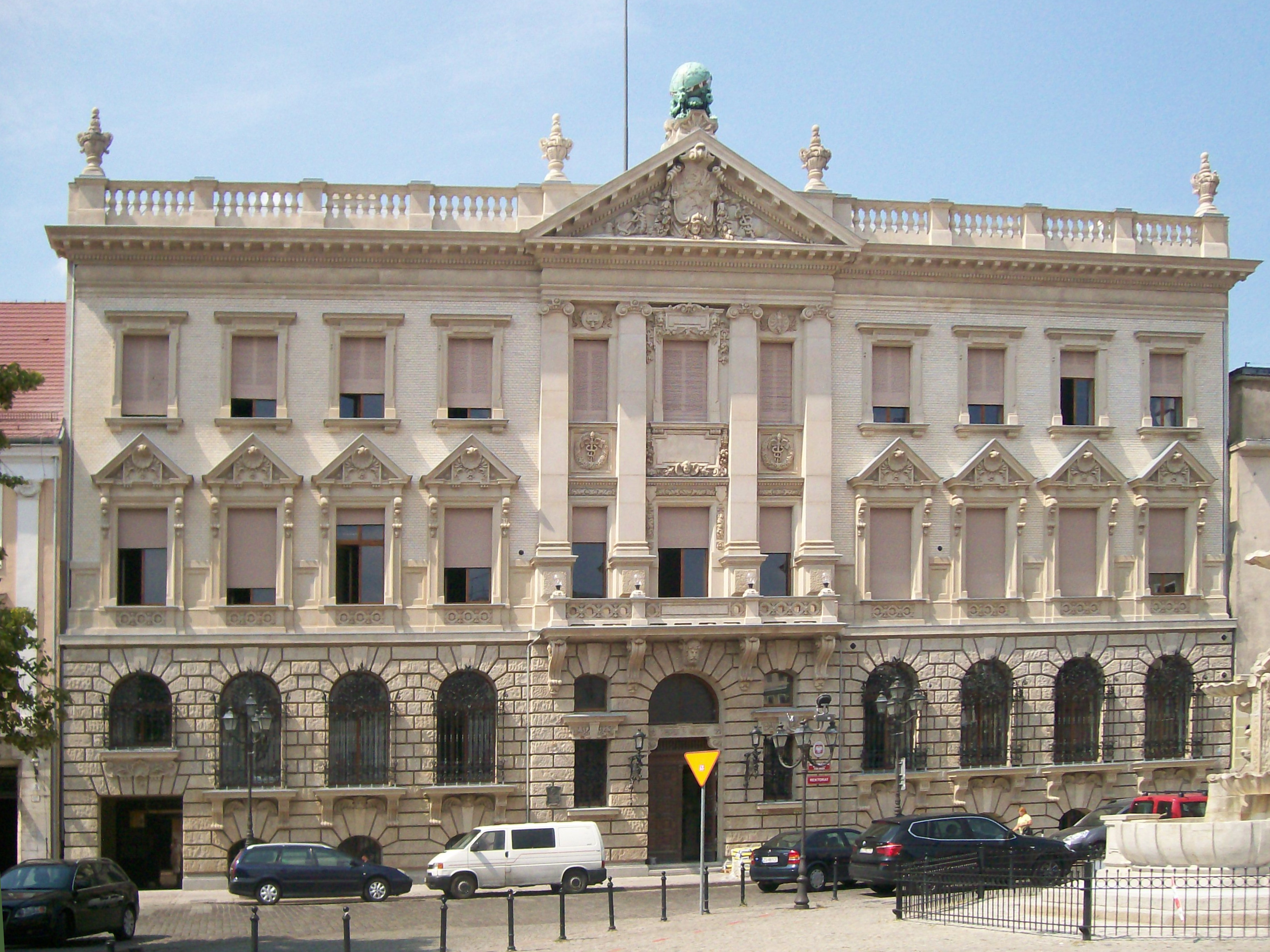
The Globe Palace, a Baroque Revival tenement house from 1891 at 2 White Eagle Square, alongside Staromłyńska Street.

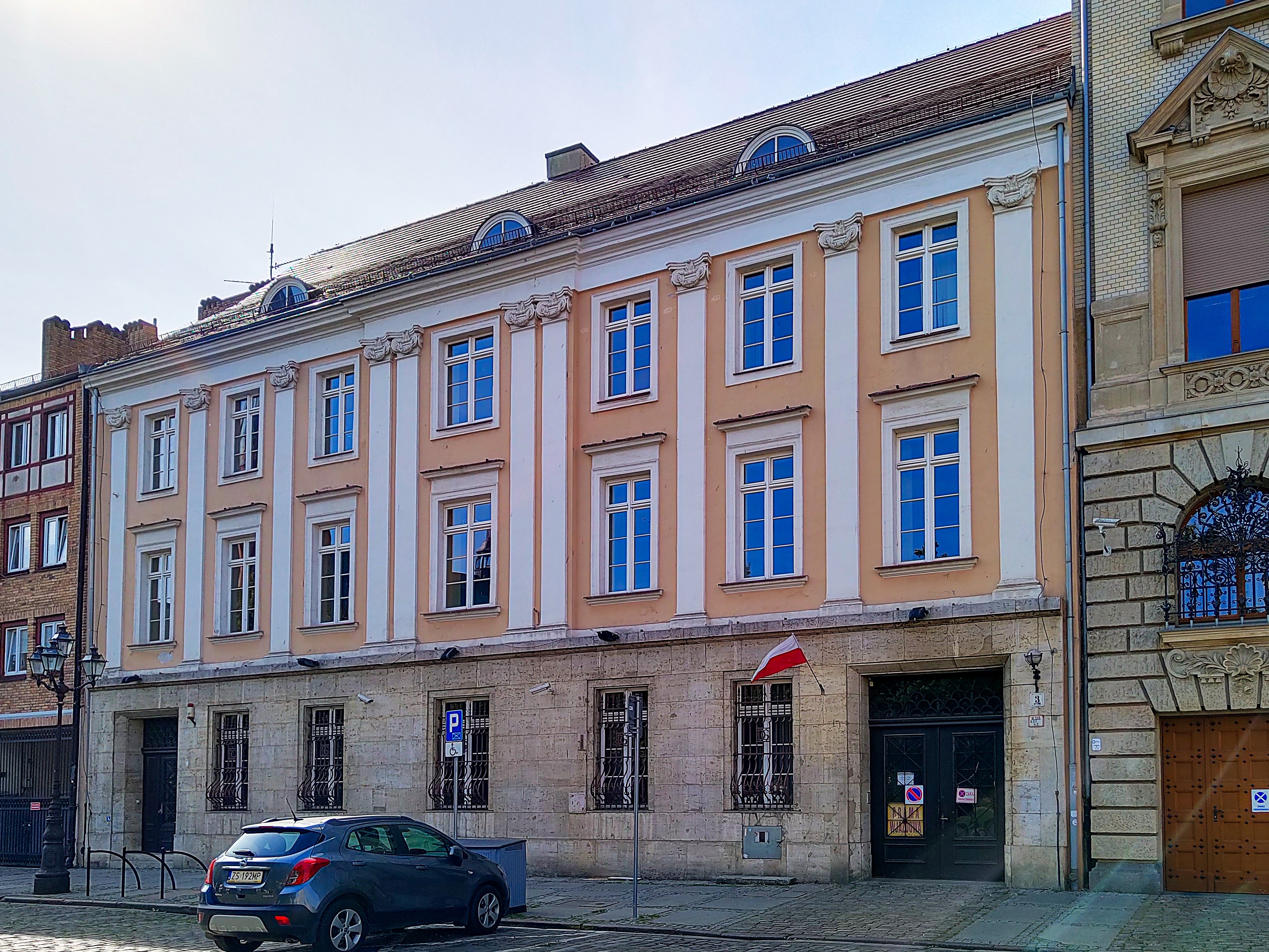
The Ionic Palace, a neoclassical tenement house from the 18th century at 3 White Eagle Square, alongside Staromłyńska Street.

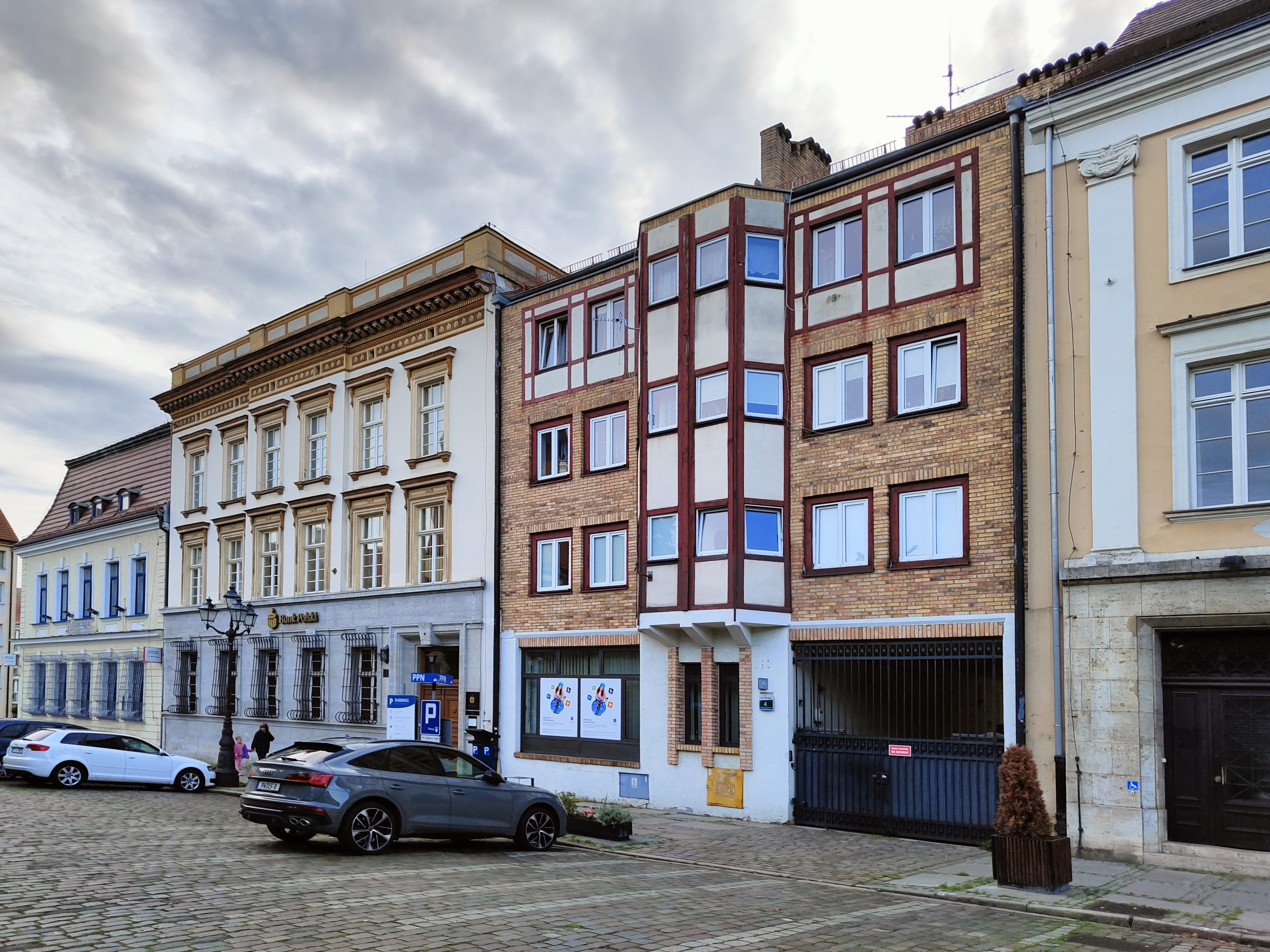
The modernist tenement house from the 1990s at 4 White Eagle Square, alongside Staromłyńska Street.

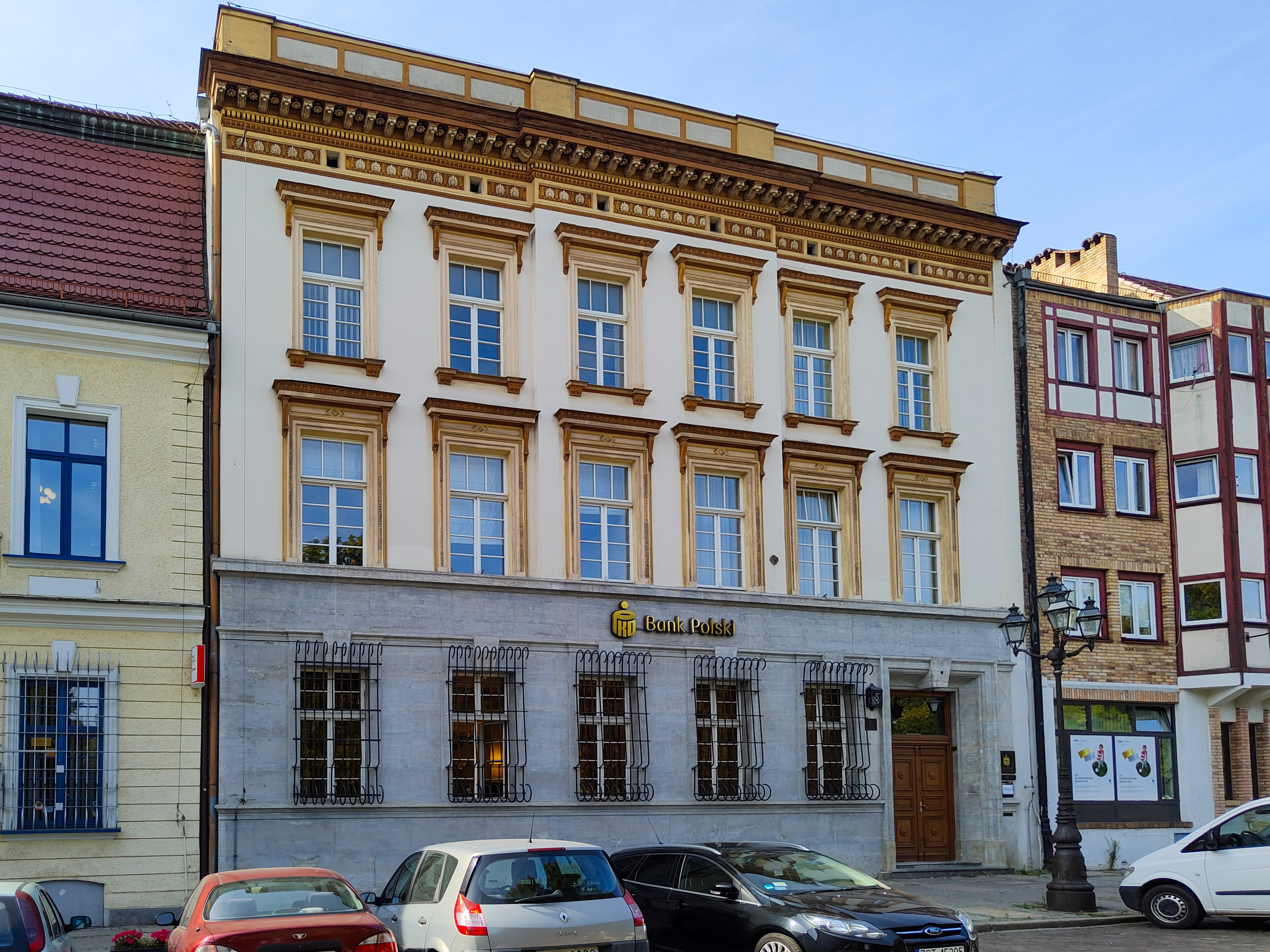
The neoclassical tenement house from the 18th century at 5 White Eagle Square, alongside Staromłyńska Street.

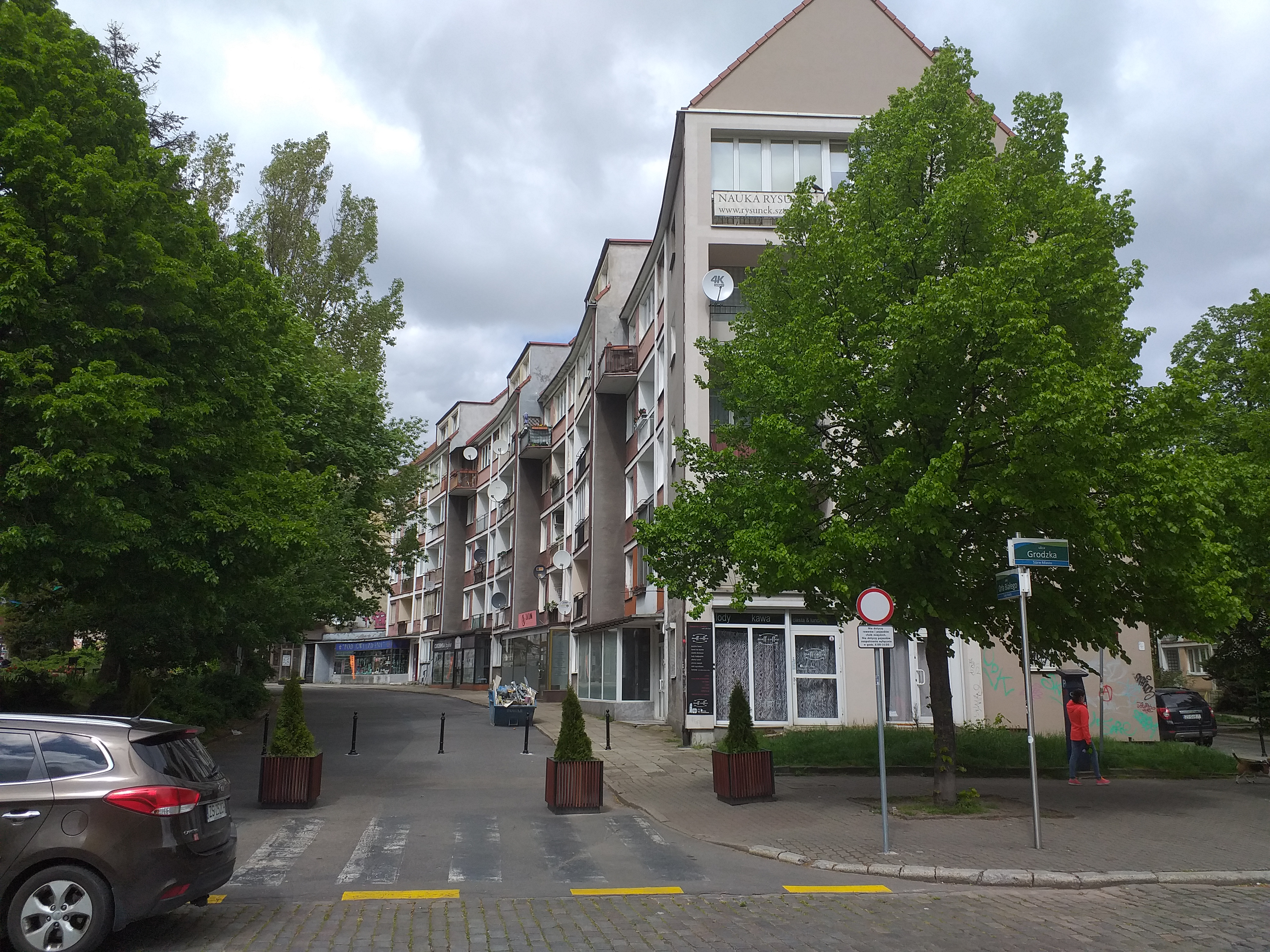
Apartment buildings at 6 to 10 White Eagle Square, alongside Bogdanski Street.

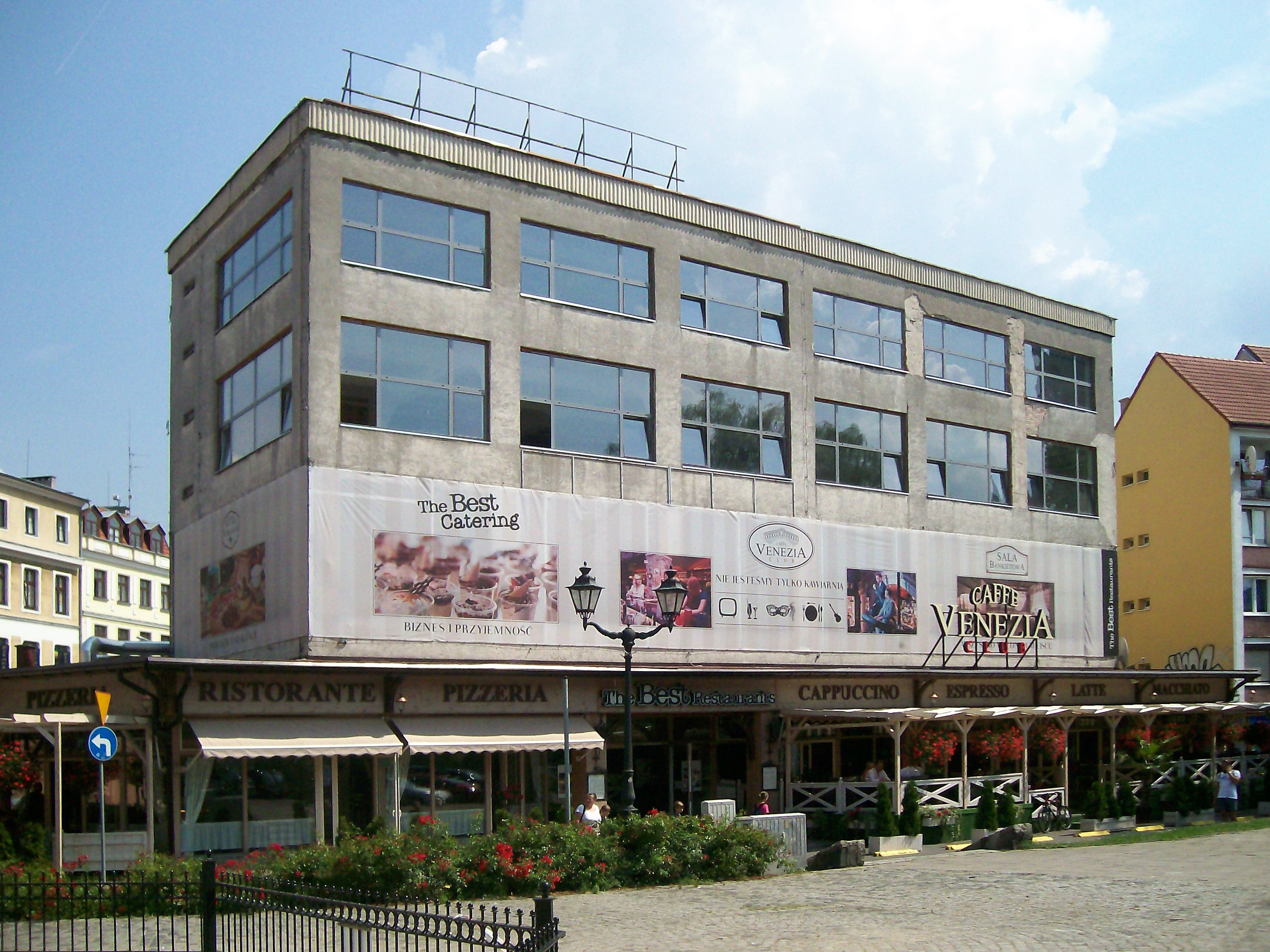
The former department store modernist building at 10 White Eagle Square, at the corner of Koński Kierat and Bogdanski Street.

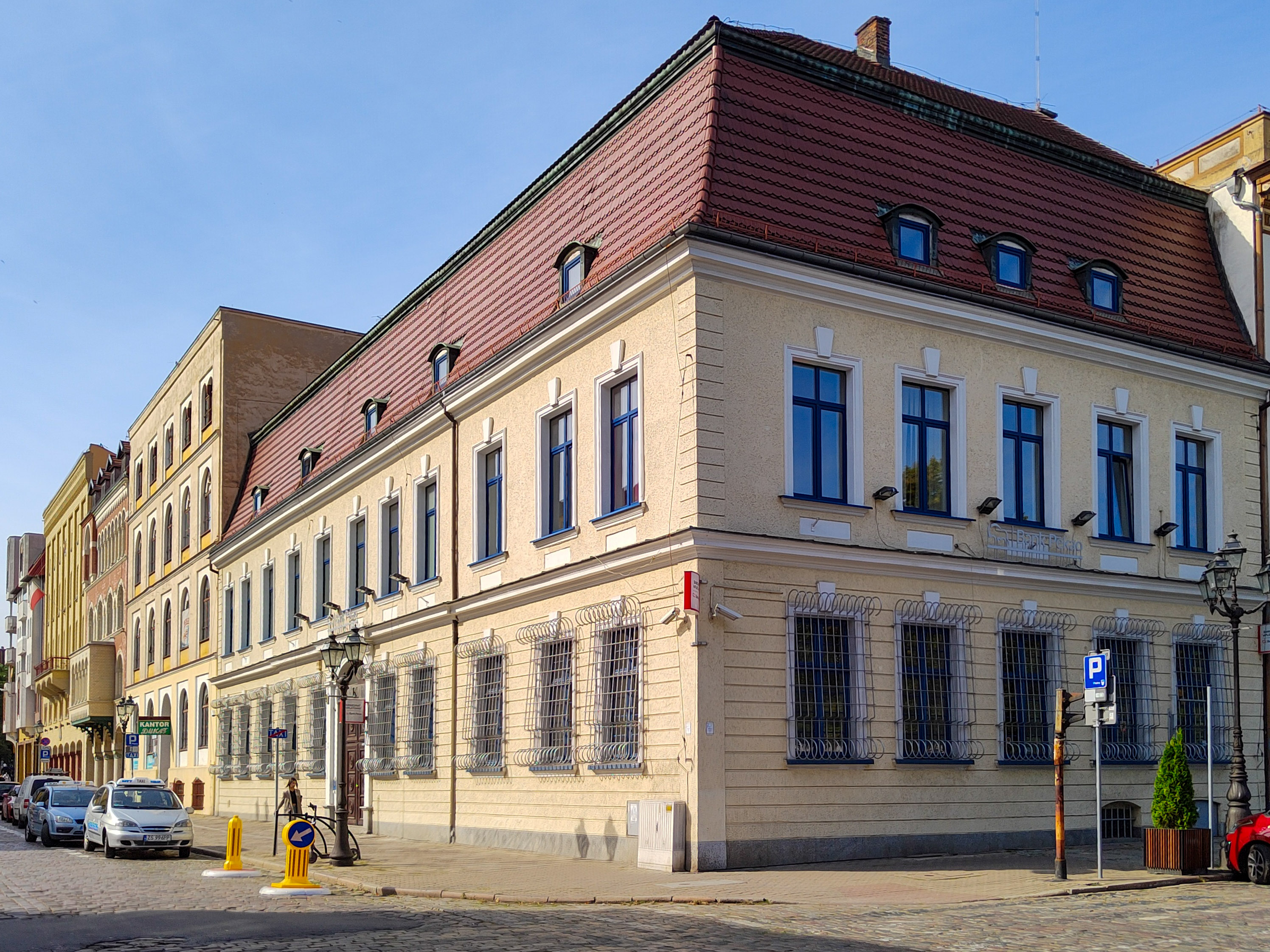
The neoclassical tenement house from the 18th century at 9 Grodzka Street, at the corner with Staromłyńska Street, next to the White Eagle Square.

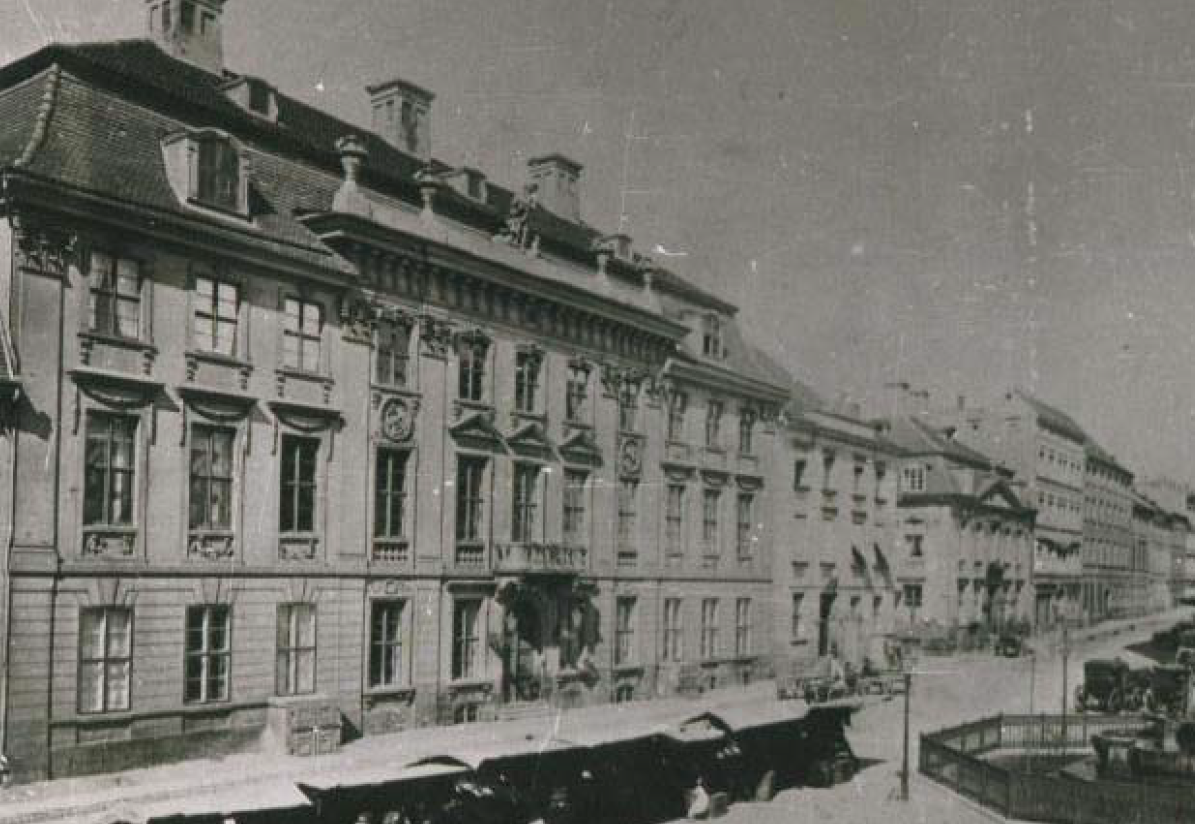
The Grumbkow Palace which stood at the White Eagle Square between 1725 and 1890.
