= Independence Avenue (Szczecin) =

Street in Szczecin, Poland

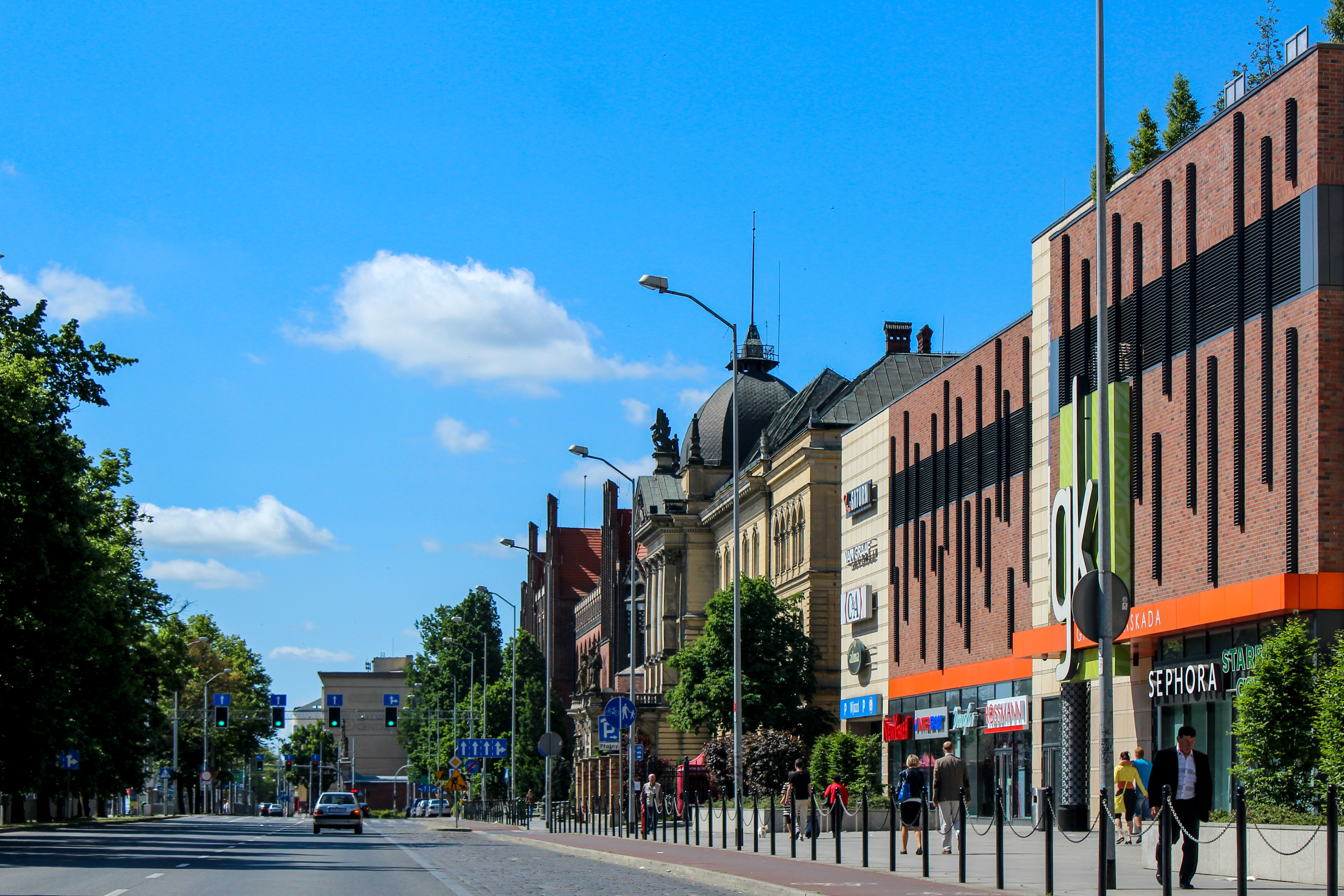
- Independence Avenue in 2015, at the location of the Galeria Kaskada shopping centre.

- Location within Poland
- Type: Street
- Location: Szczecin, Poland
- Coordinates: 53°25′35.19″N 14°33′05.48″E
- North: Adamowicz Square; Bałuki Street; Emancipation Avenue; Polish Soldier Square
- East: Wyszyńskiego Street
- South: Dworcowa Street; Trzeciego Maja Street
- West: Bogurodzicy Street; Victory Square

Construction
- Completed: 1725

Independence Avenue (Polish: Aleja Niepodległości) is an avenue street in Szczecin, Poland, located in the Downtown district, crossing the neighbourhoods of Centre and New Town. It is placed on north–south axis. At its northern end, it intersects with and Adamowicz Square, Bałuki Street, Emancipation Avenue, and Polish Soldier Square, and at its southern end, with Dworcowa and Trzeciego Maja Streets. Along its length, it also forms intersections with Bogurodzicy Street, Victory Square, and Wyszyńskiego Street. It is primarily surrounded by tenement houses and apartment buildings. It also features the Post Office Building no. 1, a Gothic Revival building from 1905, currently used by the Polish Post, the Pomeranian Landowners Palace, a Baroque Revival building from 1895, currently used by the Szczecin Art Academy, and the Galeria Kaskada shopping centre. Independence Avenue was first formed in 1725 as an urban square, known as the Green Parade Square (German: Grüner Paradeplatz; Polish: Zielony Plac Parad). At the beginning of the 19th century, it was transformed into a wide pedestrian avenue with rows of trees, and from 1809, it was simply known as the Parade Square (German: Paradeplatz; Polish: Plac Parad), receiving its current name in 1945.

== Toponomy ==
The name Independence Avenue (Polish: Aleja Niepodległości) commemorates the independence of the Polish state, first gained in 1918 after the end of the First World War, and again 1945, after in the end of the Second World War. The street was named it in 1945. Previously, until 1809, it was known as the Parade Square (German: Paradeplatz; Polish: Plac Parad), due to being a location used for hosting on numerous military parades. Prior to 1809, it was known as the Green Parade Square (German: Grüner Paradeplatz; Polish: Zielony Plac Parad), to differentiate it from the nearby White Parade Square, which was then renamed to the King's Square, and is now known as the Polish Soldier Square.

== History ==
The square was formed in 1725, in place of former moat, which was filled in filled in with the rubble from city walls. Placed on the inside of the new city fortification, it had a width of 45 m (147,64 ft.), and stretched alongside the new city walls, which were built between 1720 and 1740. In 1729, military barracks were constructed at the corner with the modern Wyszyńskiego Street. They were later deconstructed in 1873. The location was used host numerous military parades, and became known as the Green Parade Square (German: Grüner Paradeplatz; Polish: Zielony Plac Parad). At the beginning of the 19th century, it was transformed into a wide pedestrian avenue with rows of trees, and from 1809, it was simply known as the Parade Square (German: Paradeplatz; Polish: Plac Parad), after the nearby White Parade Square, was renamed to the King's Square (now known as the Polish Soldier Square). Several tenements and store buildings were also constructed alongside it, as one of the first residential and retail buildings constructed outside the former city walls.

On 1 November 1894, a monument dedicated to Wilhelm I, emperor of Germany from 1871 to 1888, was unveiled at the roundabout, forming the intersection of Parade Square and King's Square. It was designed by sculptor Karl Hilgers, and consisted of a bronze statue of the emperor on a horse, placed on a stone pedestal, with bronze sculptures of the soldiers around it. During the Second World War, the statues of the soldiers in the monument were taken down to be melted for materials. On 31 July 1945, after the end of the conflict, the monument was torn down by the Polish inhabitants of the city. The statue was then taken to Denmark and melted. It was used to manufacture the replica of the Prince Józef Antoni Poniatowski Monument in Warsaw, which was destroyed during the war.

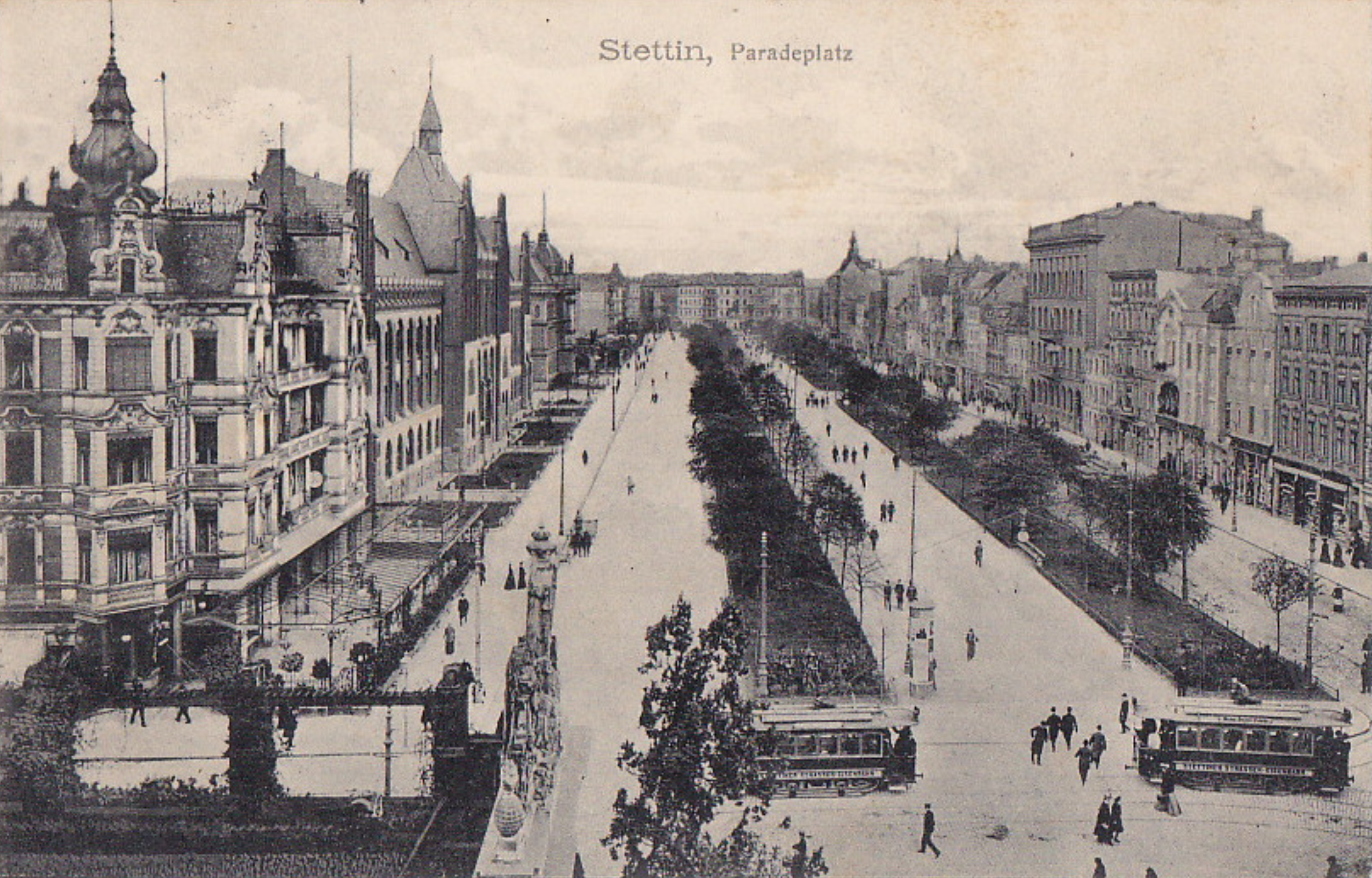
The Parade Square in 1906, as seen from the intersection with Broad Street (now Wyszyńskiego Street).

In 1895, the Pomeranian Landowners Palace was built alongside the avenue, as the headquarters of the General Landscape Administration of Pomerania (German: Pommersche Generallandschaftsdirektion), an organisation of the wealthy landowners of the Province of Pomerania, and the Pomeranian Rural Bank (German: Pommersche Landschaft). In 1905, the building of the Royal Mail of Prussia was built next to. The same year in place of the former barracks was built a large tenement building, known colloquially as the Grey Castle. In 1912, a cloths factory, later renamed to Odermark, was opened at the intersection the current Bałuki Street. In 1928, the shopping centre Familien Kaufhaus, owned by company DeFaKa, was opened at the corner with the Victory Square. In 1929, the entertainment complex Haus Ponath was opened next to the Odermark factory.

In 1904, a tram line was opened crossing the square, between Szczecin Główny railway station and Niemierzyńska Street.

The largest military parades in the history of the avenue took place in the 1930s and 1940s. On 12 June 1938, a large parade was held for the visit of Adolf Hitler, the dictator of Germany, to the city, with the participation of Wehrmacht, Storm Division, and Protection Squadron. Later, in 1938 and 1939, there were also organized parades celebrating the successful annexation of Austria, and the invasion of Poland. Another large parade took place on 9 June 1940, celebrating the return of soldiers from the victorious Battle of France. They were greeted by August von Mackensen, a general field marshal of the Imperial German Army during the First World War.

After the end of the Second World War, when the administration of the city was transferred from German to Polish government, the Parade Square was renamed to Independence Avenue in 1945, commemorating independence of Polish state, first gained in 1918, and again 1945. Most of the buildings surrounding the avenue were destroyed in the aerial bombings during the conflict. This included most of the tenements, as well as Familien Kaufahaus, and the post office, with the latter being rebuilt after the conflict, for the exploration by the Polish Post. In place of the emptied parcels were constructed apartment buildings. In 1951, in place of Familien Kaufhaus was built the Posejdon department store. After the war, the Pomeranian Landowners Palace became the regional headquarters of the PKO Bank Polski, remaining there until 2014, later housing economic schools, and in 2016, being acquired by the Szczecin Art Academy for its Faculty of Music. In 1962, the former Haus Ponath building was added for the restaurant complex Kaskada, which later burned down on 27 April 1981, with 14 people dying in the event. The neighbouring Odermark building was adopted into the Odra Clothing Industry Factory in 1964, and was eventually deconstructed in 2008. In 1970, a tram operations building, together with ticket booths, at the intersection with the Victory Square. It was known colloquially as the Little Mushroom (Polish: Grzybek) and was demolished in 2007.

In 2011, the Galeria Kaskada shopping centre was opened in place of the former restaurant complex and clothing factory. In 2012, on both side of the avenue, at the corner with Victory Square, were opened modernist office buildings Brama Portowa I and Brama Portowa II. The first of the two was constructed in place of the former tram operations building. Between 2016 and 2019, the former building of the Posejdon department store, which was closed down in 2009, was rebuilt into a modernist office building, named Posejdon Center.

== Characteristics ==
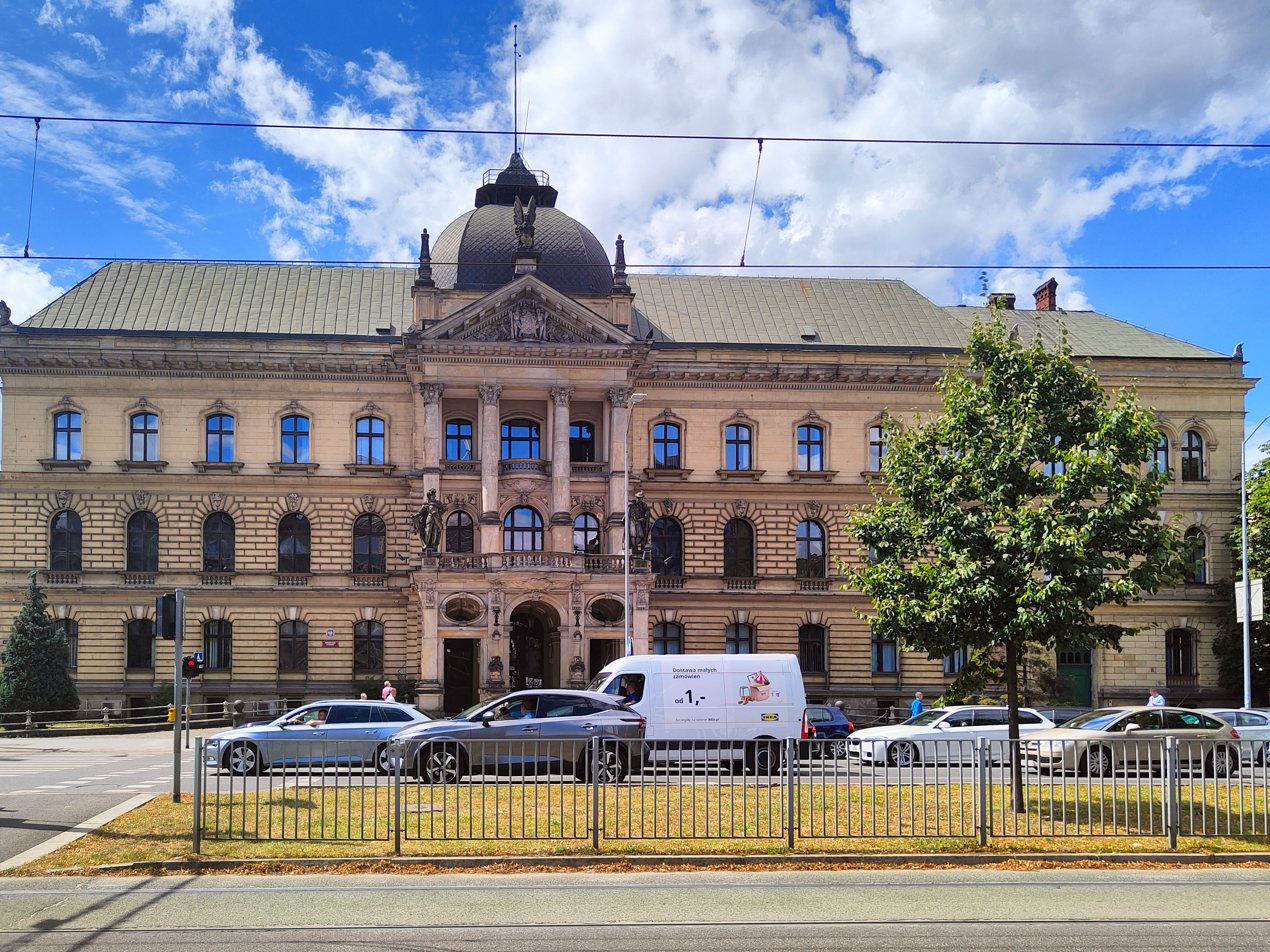
The Pomeranian Landowners Palace at 40 Independence Avenue, a Baroque Revival building from 1895, currently used by the Szczecin Art Academy.

Independence Avenue is a street in Szczecin, Poland, located in the Downtown district, crossing the neighbourhoods of Centre and New Town. It is placed on north–south axis, and has a form of an avenue, with two traffic lanes separated by a strip of greenery. At its northern end, it intersects with Adamowicz Square, Bałuki Street, Emancipation Avenue, and Polish Soldier Square, and at its southern end, with Dworcowa and Trzeciego Maja Streets. Along its stretch, it forms intersections with Bogurodzicy Street, Victory Square, and Wyszyńskiego Street. The avenue also includes the tram line tracks. The street is surrounded by tenement buildings and apartment buildings. On its northwester side, it also features the Post Office Building no. 1, a Gothic Revival building from 1905, currently used by the Polish Post, the Pomeranian Landowners Palace, a Baroque Revival building from 1895, currently used by the Szczecin Art Academy, and the Galeria Kaskada shopping centre. In the south, at the intersection with Victory Square and Wyszyńskiego Street, it also includes modernist office buildings of Brama Portowa I, Brama Portowa II, and Posejdon Center.

== Gallery ==
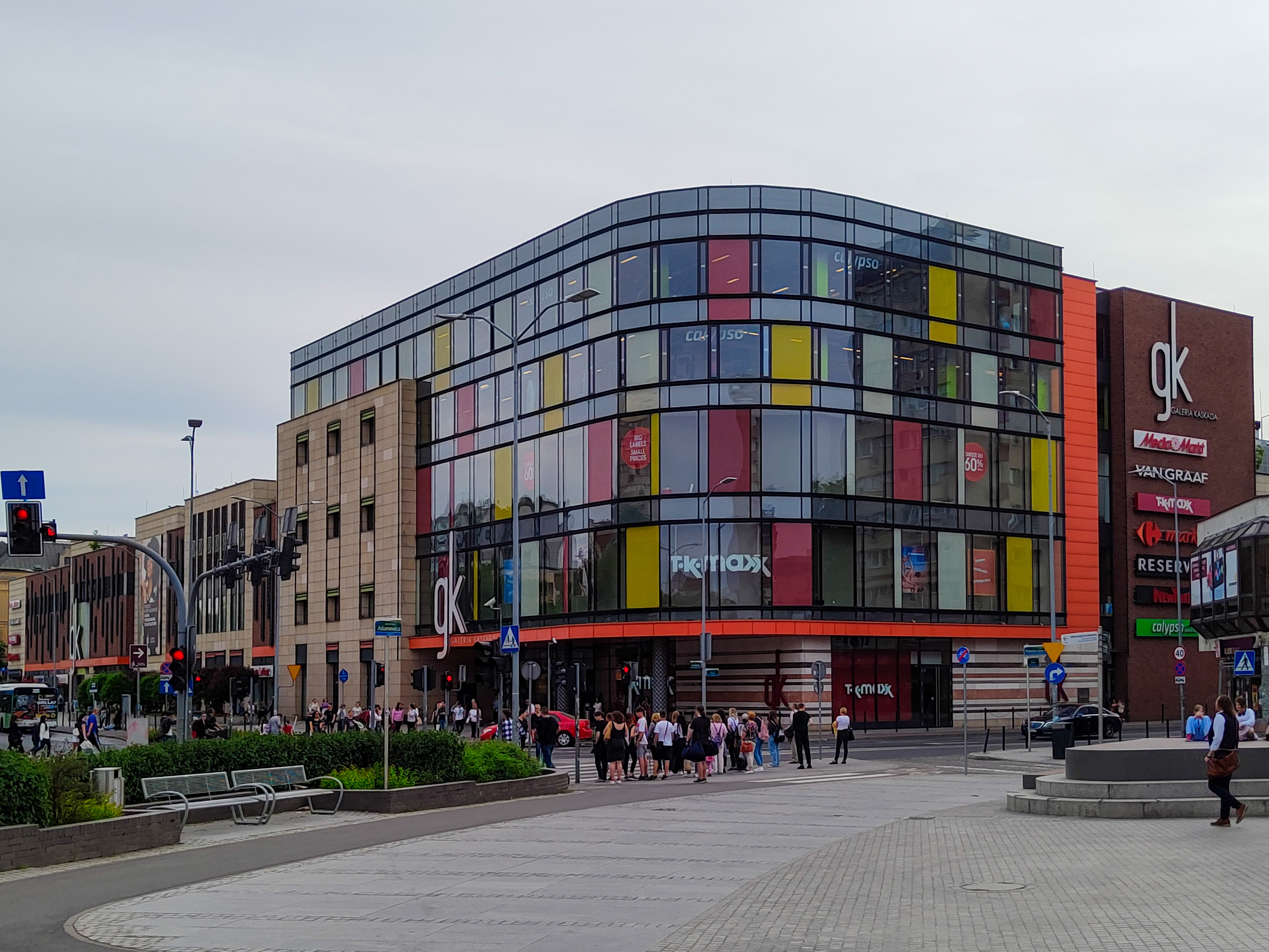
The Galeria Kaskada shopping centre at 36 Independence Avenue.

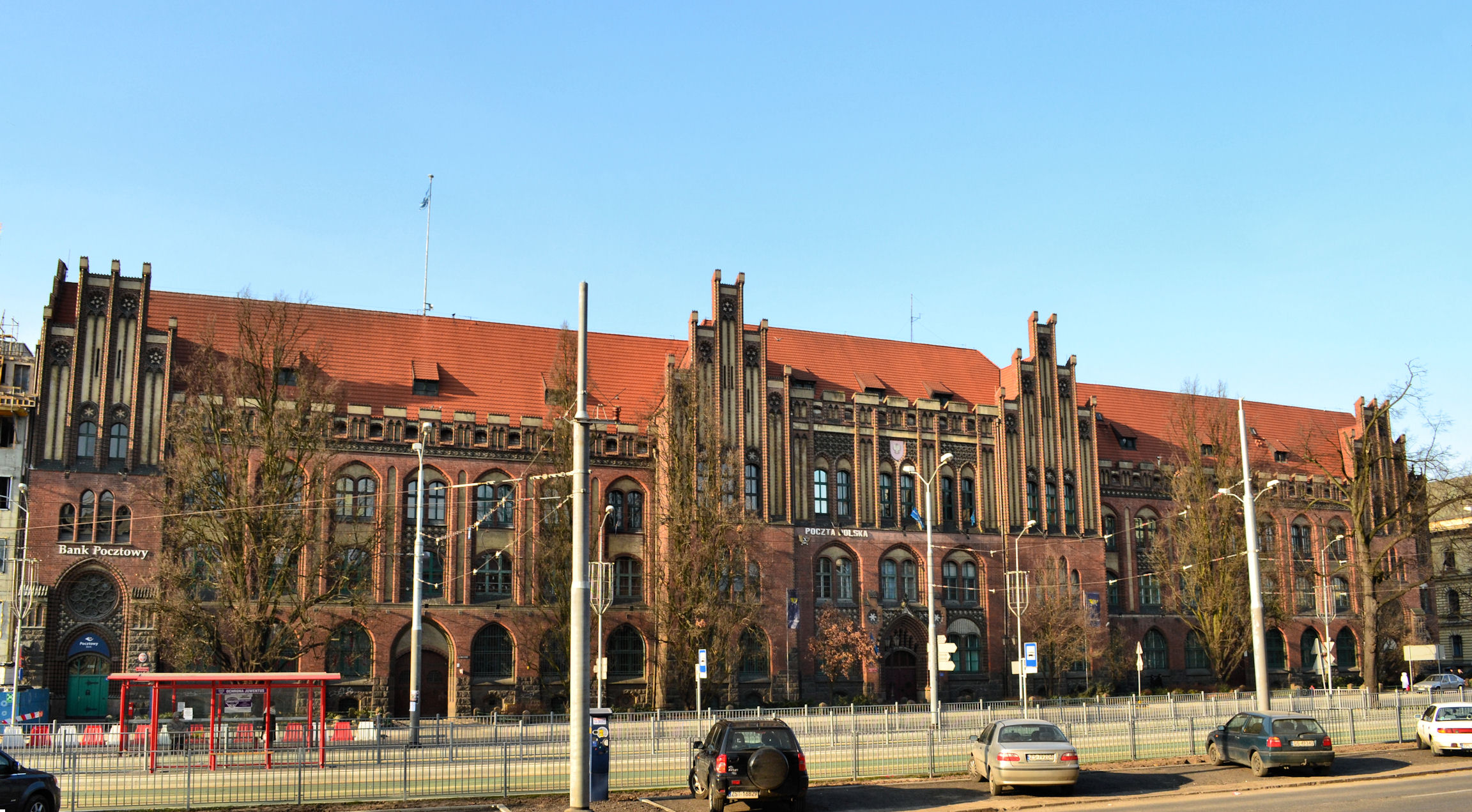
The Post Office Building at 41 and 42 Independence Avenue.

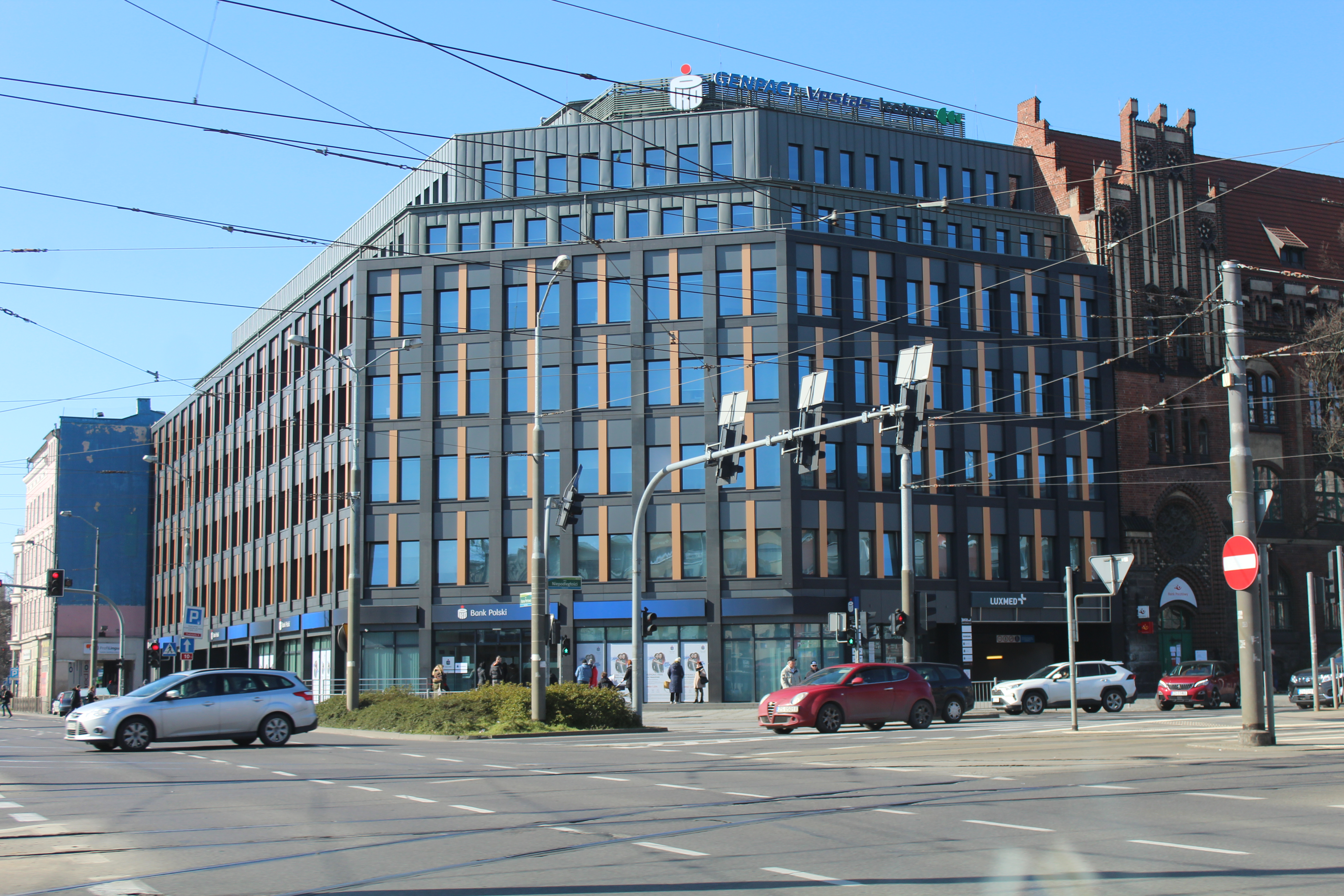
The Brama Portowa II office building at 44 Independence Avenue.

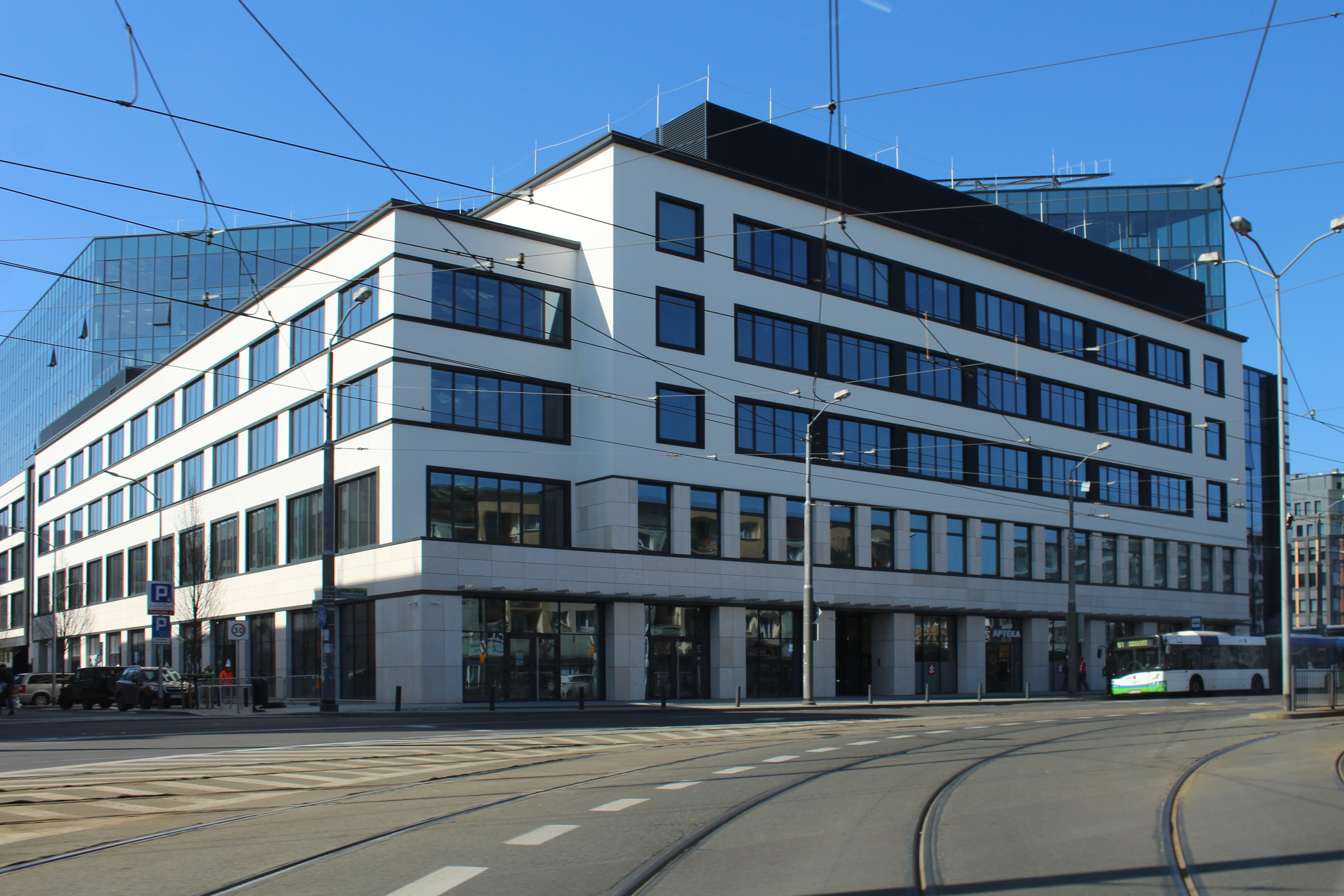
The Posejdon Center office building at 60 Independence Avenue.

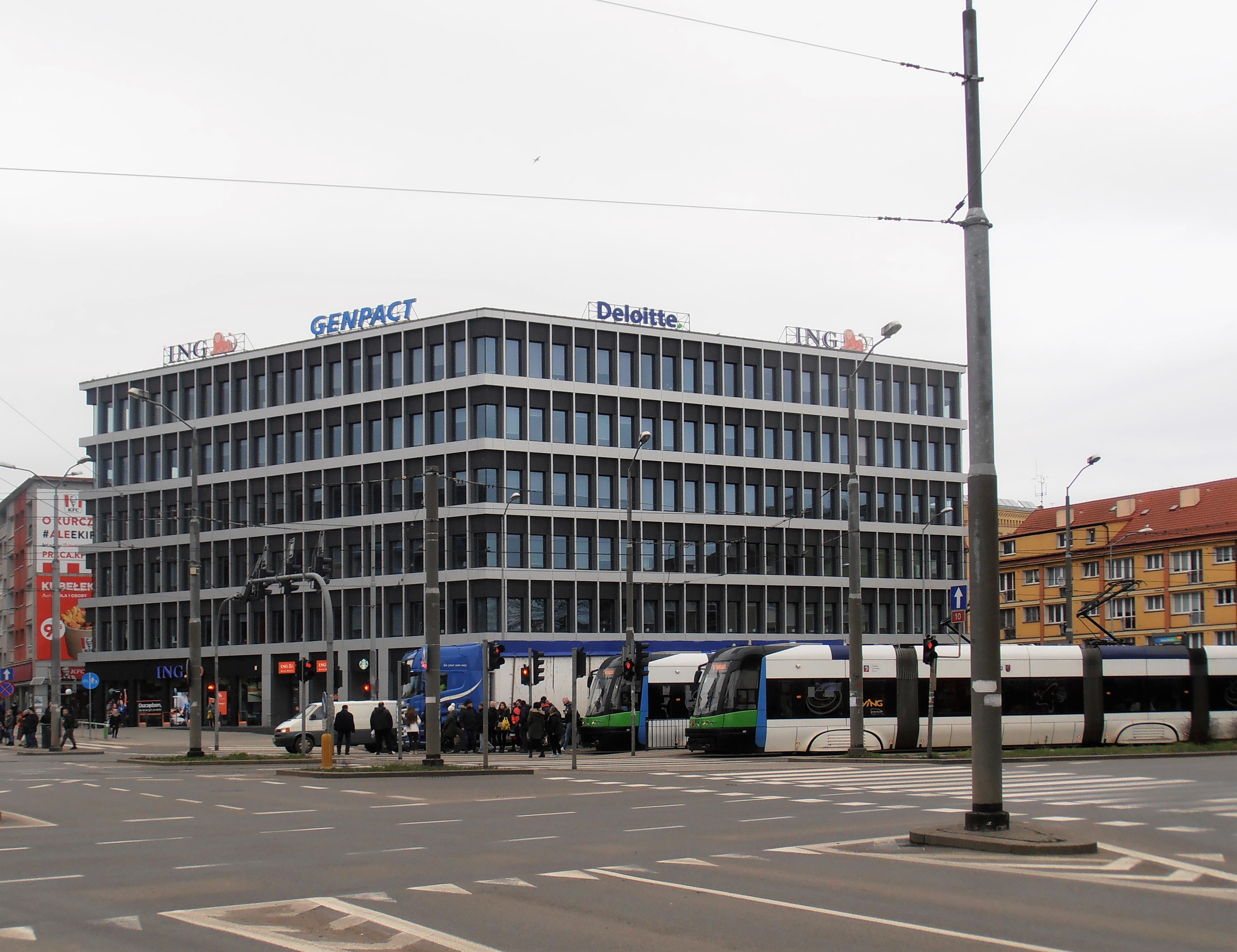
The Brama Portowa I at 1 Wyszyńskiego Street, at the corner of Independence Avenue.

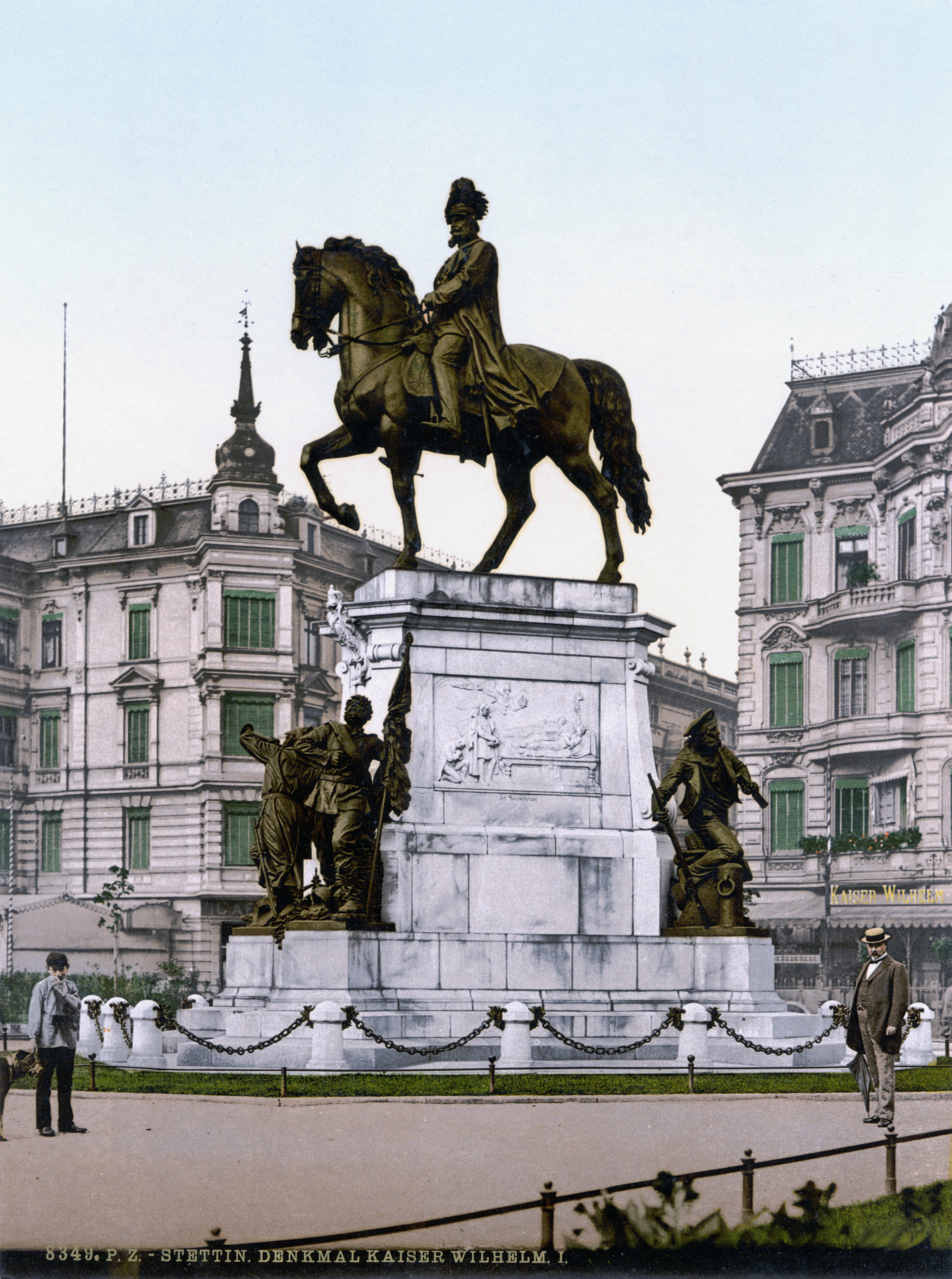
The William I Monument, unveiled in 1894 at the intersection of Parade Square and King's Square (now Independence Avenue and Polish Soldier Square). Destroyed in 1945.

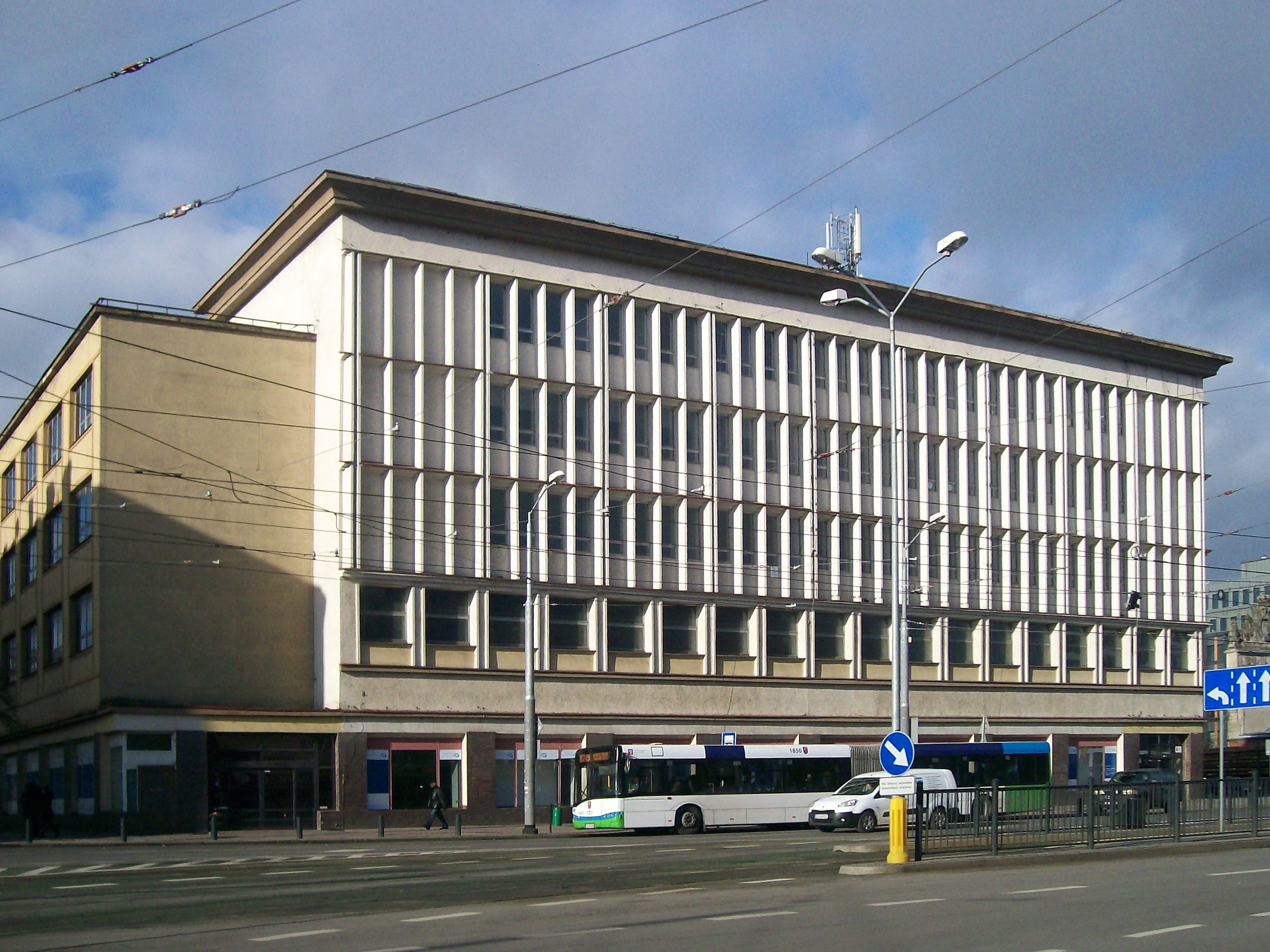
The Posejdon department store, built in 1951, and replaced by the Posejdon Center in 2019.

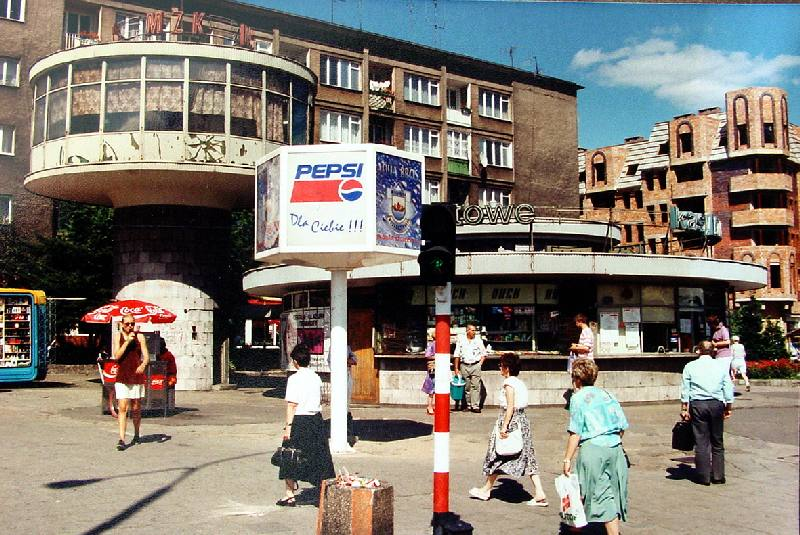
The Little Mushroom, a tram operations building built in 1970 and demolished in 2007.
