= Barnucin =

Neighbourhood of Szczecin, Poland

Barnucin is a district of Szczecin City, Poland situated on the right bank of Oder river, east of the Szczecin Old Town, and south of Szczecin-Dąbie.
