= Brama Portowa I =

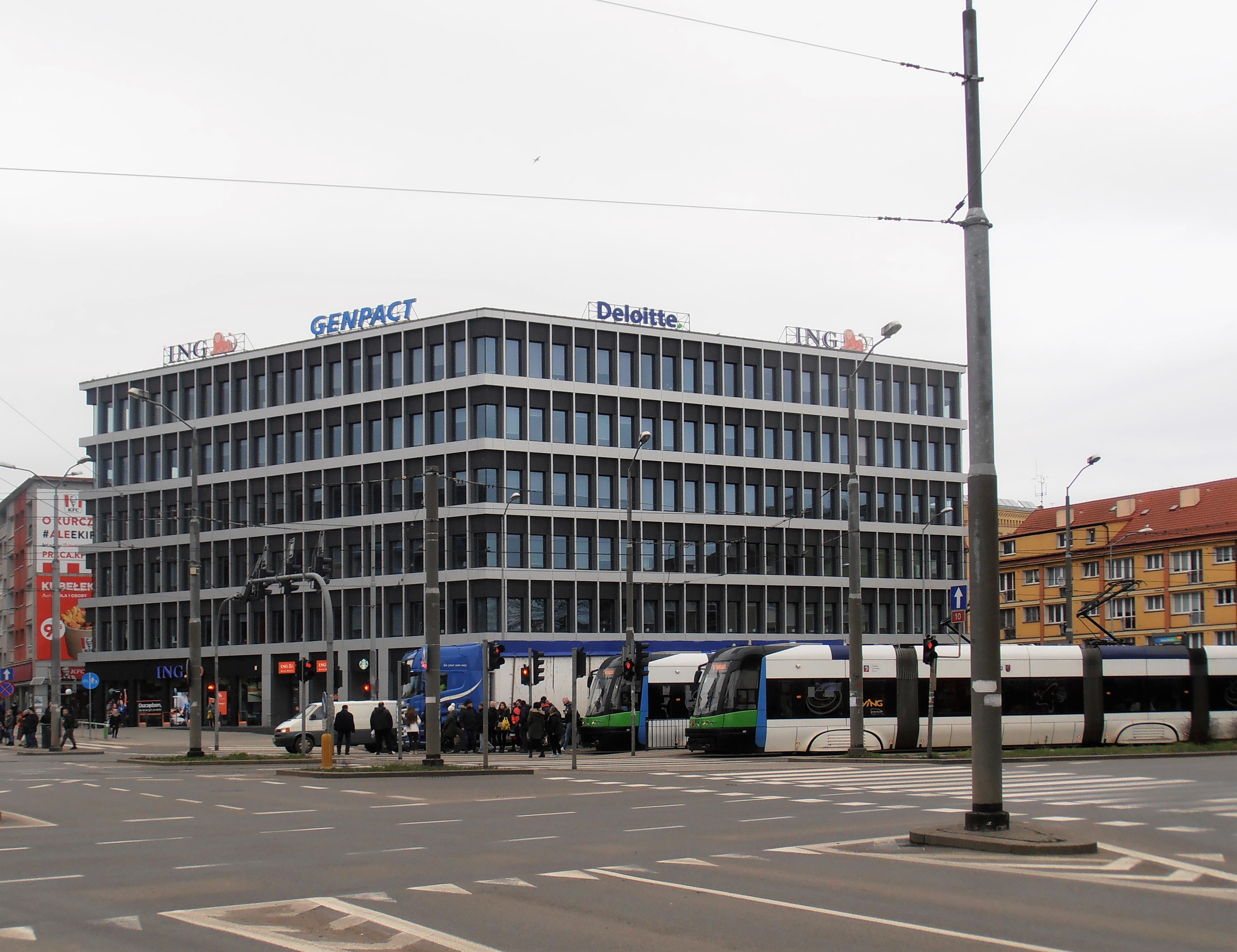
- View from Plac Brama Portowa
- Interactive map of the Brama Portowa I area

General information
- Type: office building
- Architectural style: modernism
- Location: ulica Wyszyńskiego 1, 70-200, Szczecin, Poland
- Coordinates: 53.42529°N 14.55182°E
- Named for: Harbour Gate, Szczecin
- Construction started: 2011
- Completed: 2012
- Cost: 75,000,000 zł
- Owner: FLE SICAV FIS

Technical details
- Floor count: 7

Design and construction
- Architecture firm: T-33 Architekci
- Awards and prizes: LEED Gold

Other information
- Parking: yes
- Public transit access: trams, buses

Website
- bramaportowa.com

Brama Portowa I (Polish pronunciation: [ˈbrãma pɔrˈtɔva ˈjɛdɛ̃n]) is an A-class office building located in the quarter bounded by Niepodległości Avenue, Wyszyński Street and Tkacka Street, in the Old Town, in the Śródmieście district. Brama Portowa I earned a LEED Gold certification.

== History ==
Between 1970 and 2007 the site of the current office building occupied the "Grzybek" traffic control building. After the demolition of "Grzybek", in 2008 the site became the property of Inter IKEA Centre Polska. The new owner commenced construction works in January 2011. The building was completed in August 2012.

At the end of January 2021 the Brama Portowa I office building together with the neighbouring Brama Portowa II was sold to the Austrian fund FLE SICAV FIS.
