= Hotel Metropole, Szczecin =

Former hotel in Szczecin, Poland

Hotel Metropole
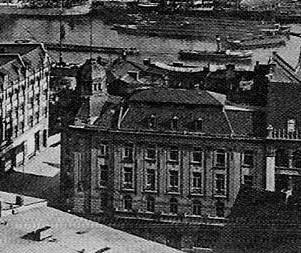
- Aerial view of the hotel

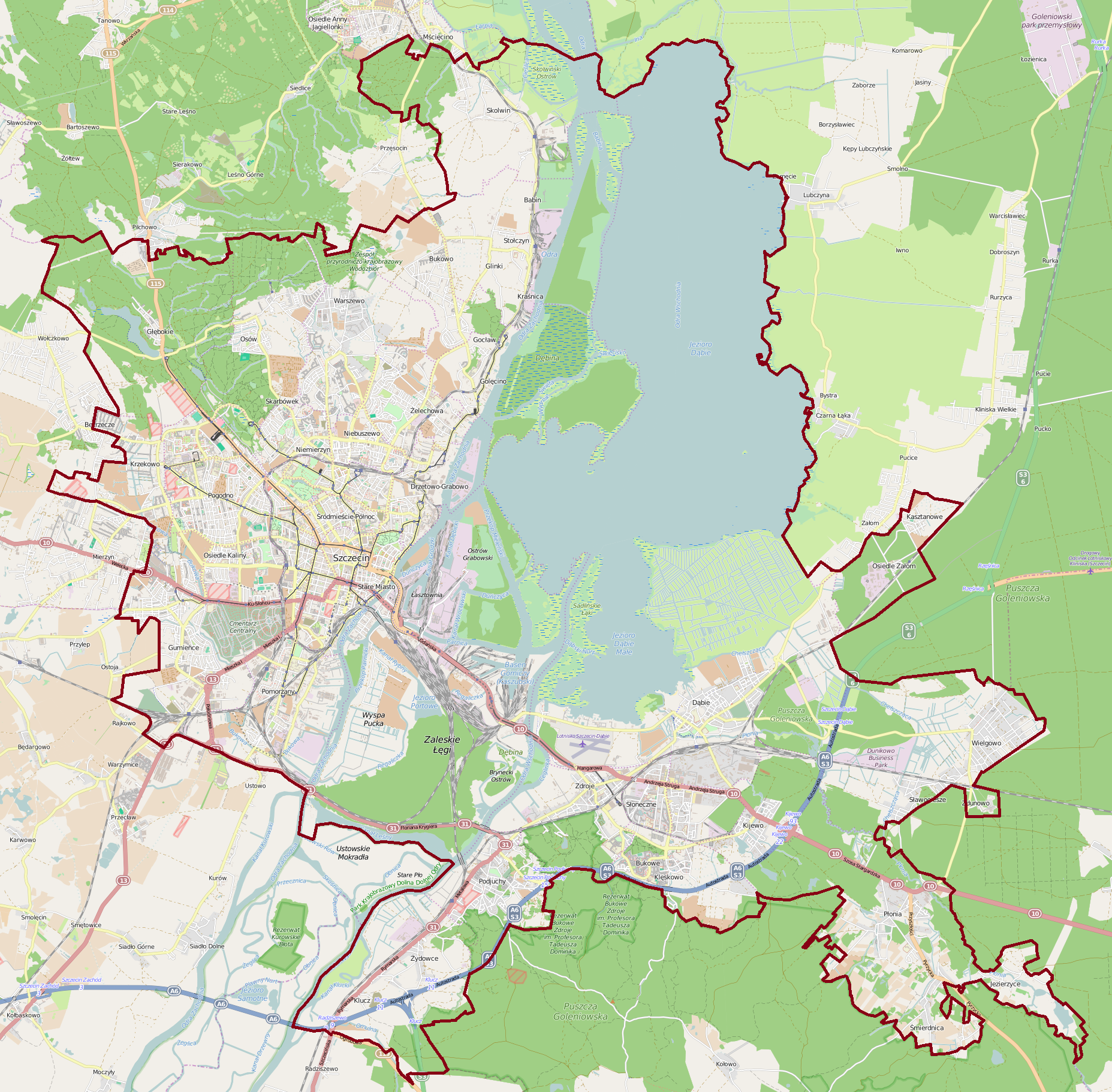
- Location within Szczecin

General information
- Type: hotel
- Location: Heiligegeiststraße 7b, Szczecin, Poland
- Coordinates: 53.421694°N 14.556°E
- Construction started: 1900
- Completed: 1901
- Opened: 1901
- Destroyed: 1945

Technical details
- Material: brick

Other information
- Number of rooms: 100
- Number of restaurants: 1

The Hotel Metropole in Szczecin was a hotel, which was located at the corner of today's Holy Spirit Street and Podwale streets, in the Old Town, in the Centre district. It was destroyed in the Second World War.

== History ==
The Hotel Metropole was built between 1900 and 1901 in what was then the city of Stettin, Germany, on then Heiligegeiststraße 7b. The building had a total of 100 rooms and was one of the largest hotel buildings in pre-war Stettin. A swimming pool, garages and a restaurant were also available to guests.

== Description ==
The Metropole Hotel was a corner, four-storey building. The wing from the side of Heiligegeiststraße was seven-axial, whereas from the side of Podwale Street – one axis shorter. The façade of the first and second floor was decorated with bossage. The main entrance was located in the corner of the building. The façade of the upper storeys was divided by cornices. The roof was covered by tiles. The corner crowned a tented roof with a spire.

The hotel was destroyed during the bombing of Stettin in World War II. After the war, the city and surrounding region were ceded to Poland, and the hotel's ruins were cleared away and since then the space has been used as a temporary bus parking.

== Guests ==
At the end of January 1907, Ida Altmann, a German activist of the proletarian women's movement, spent the night at the Hotel Metropole. On 21 January 1907 she sent a letter from this hotel to her friend and future husband, Jager Bronn.
