= Rudolph Karstadt Department Store =

Department store in Szczecin

- Warenhaus Rudolph Karstadt
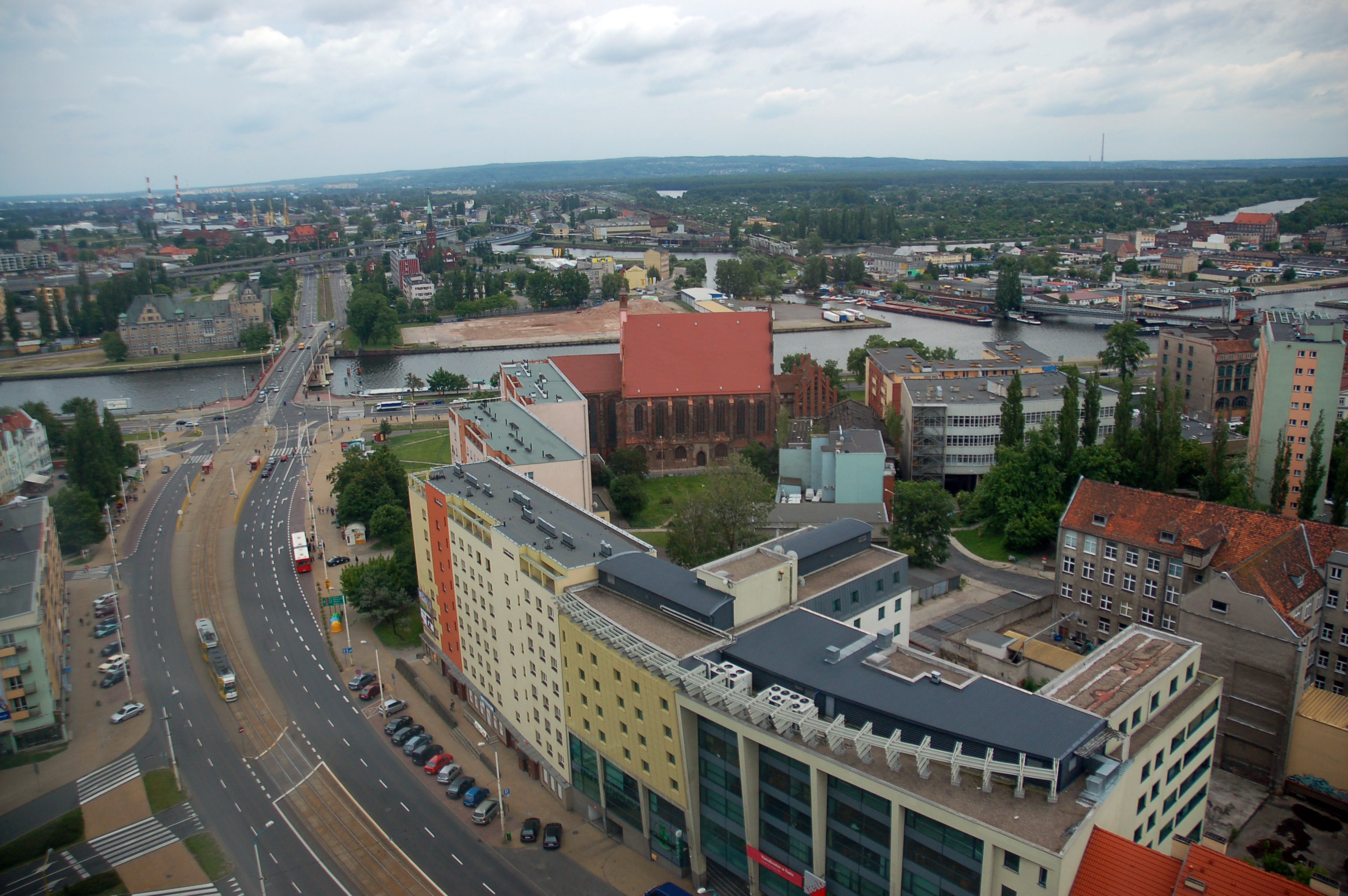
- Aerial view of the "Atrium Katedra", which stands on the site of the former department store
- Coordinates: 53°25′26.0″N 14°33′21.7″E
- Address: Old Town, Breite Straße 23–28, Szczecin
- Opened: 1916
- Closed: 1945
- Manager: Karstadt
- Owner: Karstadt
- Floors: 3
- Public transit: tram

The Rudolph Karstadt Department Store (German: Warenhaus Rudolph Karstadt, German pronunciation: [ˈvaːʁənˌhaʊ̯s ˈʁuːdɔlf ˈkaʁʃtat]) was a department store of pre-war Szczecin, which was located at today's Stefan Wyszyński Street, in the Old Town, in the Śródmieście district. The store was destroyed in World War II, though some of the ruins remained uncleared until the 1960s.

== History ==
The first building of the Szczecin branch of the Rudolph Karstadt department store was erected between 1912 and 1916 at then Breite Straße. The site for its construction was obtained by demolishing four older tenement houses. The store took its form from the Hamburg branch. Between 1923 and 1924, tenement houses no. 23 and 24, adjacent to the right gable wall, were adapted to the needs of the commercial space. During World War II, the buildings were bombed. The ruins of the larger building survived the longest: until the mid 1960s. After their demolition, the plot remained undeveloped until 2002, when the "Atrium Katedra" office and hotel building was constructed.

== Description ==
The department store consisted of two buildings. The larger one was two-storey, 33-axial with an attic. It was adjacent to the Aronheim & Cohn Department Store building with its left gable wall. The smaller one was a two-storey, 7-axial building with an attic. Both buildings had gambrel roofs with dormers.
