= Stettiner General-Anzeiger Building =

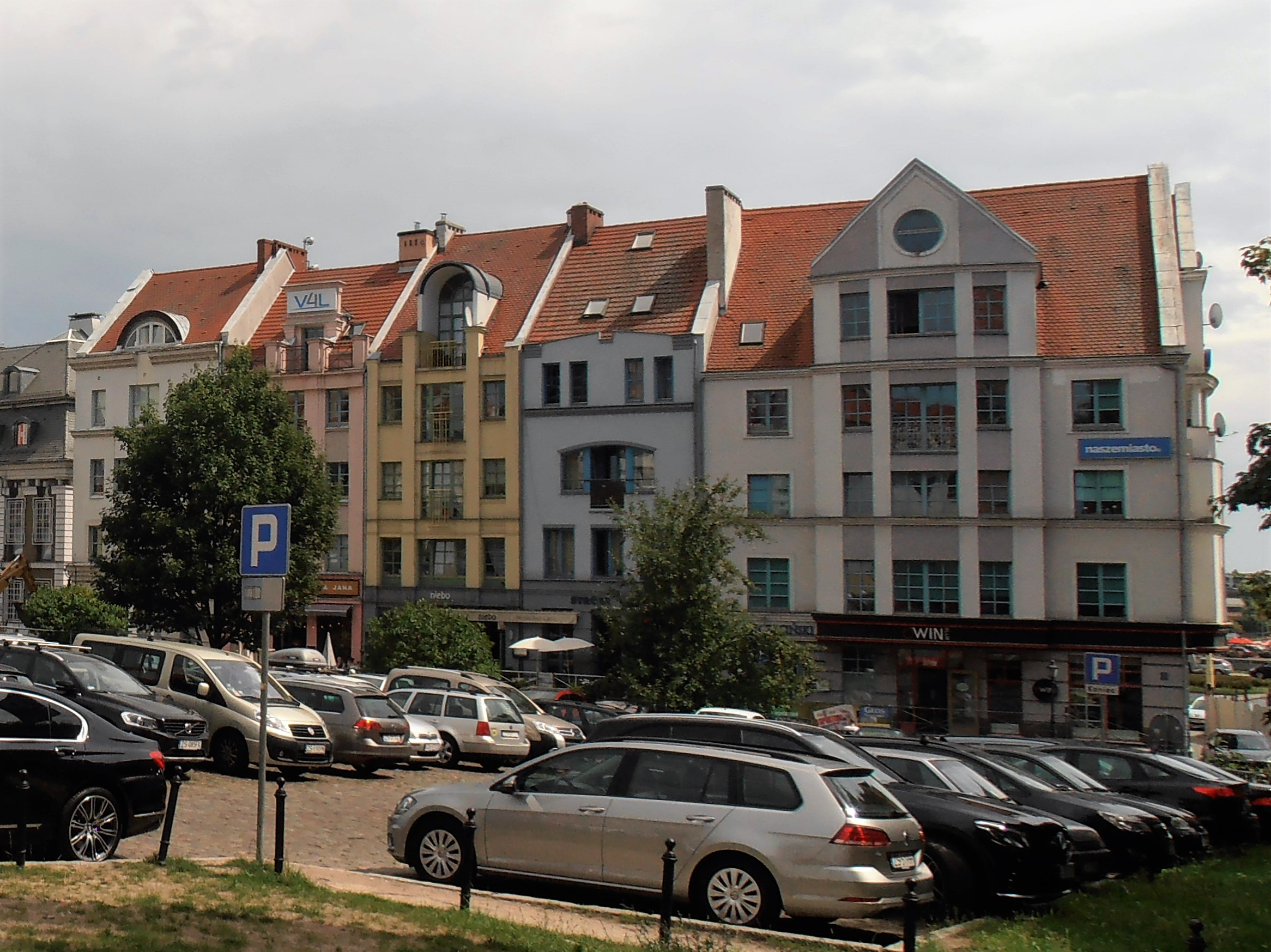
- The eastern frontage of the New Market, from the right tenement houses No. 3 and 4, which stand in place of the pre-war building
- Interactive map of the Stettiner General-Anzeiger Building area

General information
- Type: office building
- Architectural style: eclecticism
- Location: Neuer Markt 3-4, Szczecin, Poland
- Coordinates: 53.424472°N 14.56125°E
- Completed: after 1897
- Demolished: 1940s

Technical details
- Floor count: 5

Design and construction
- Architect: C. Kelm

The Stettiner General-Anzeiger Building in Szczecin (German pronunciation: [ʃtɛˈtiːnɐ ɡenəˈʁaːl ˈanˌt͡saɪ̯ɡɐ]) was an office building, which was located at the corner of today's Opłotki Street and New Market, in the Old Town, in the Centre district. It was destroyed in a bombardment in the 1940s.

== History ==
The house was built in the late 19th century. It was designed by the architect C. Kelm. The building replaced two older buildings: tenement house no. 3 inhabited by a shoemaker Brünnlein and tenement house no. 4, which was owned by an innkeeper Müller. The new building became the seat of the editorial office of the newspaper Stettiner General-Anzeiger, founded by Ewald Gentzensohn in 1848.

During the bombing of Szczecin between 1943 and 1944, the New Market area was destroyed. The surrounding buildings were demolished in the 1940s, but for unknown reasons the ruins of the Stettiner General-Anzeiger building survived until around 1954. After 1995, construction work began on the site of the building in connection with the revitalisation of the lower Old Town. However, no decision was made to restore the original appearance of the Stettiner General-Anzeiger building. The original division of the plot into two parts was reinstated and a new, post-modern building was erected on plot no. 3. In 2005 the editorial office of Głos Szczeciński was moved to the new building.
