= Aronheim & Cohn Department Store =

Department store in Szczecin

- Warenkaufhaus Aronheim & Cohn
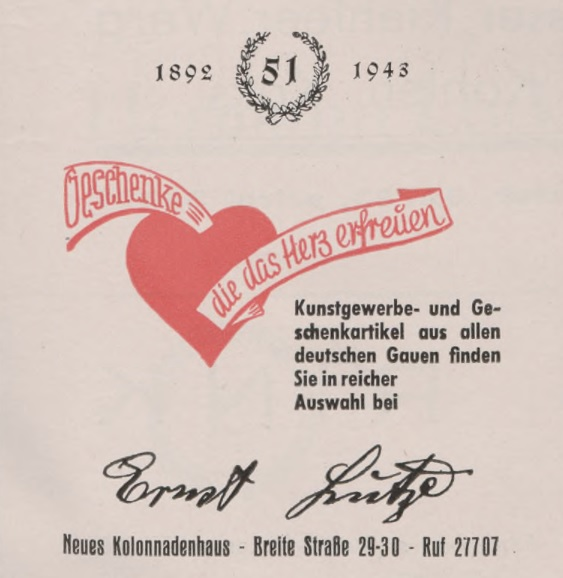
- Advertisement of a shop that was located in the department store.
- Coordinates: 53°25′26.0″N 14°33′21.7″E
- Address: Old Town, Breite Straße 29–30, Szczecin
- Opened: 1901
- Closed: 1945
- Floors: 3
- Public transit: tram

The Aronheim & Cohn Department Store (German: Warenkaufhaus Aronheim & Cohn, German pronunciation: [ˈvaːʁənˈkaʊ̯fˌhaʊ̯s ˈaʁonˌhaɪ̯m ʊnt koːnˌ]) was a department store in pre-WWII Szczecin, which was located at today's Stefan Wyszyński Street, in the Old Town, in the Śródmieście district.

The Aronheim & Cohn Department Store was adjacent to the Rudolph Karstadt Department Store with its right gable wall.

== History ==
The Aronheim & Cohn Department Store tenement was built between 1900 and 1901 on the site of an earlier building of the "Drei Kronen" hotel. In addition to shops, the building also housed a photography studio. During World War II the department store was destroyed. After the war, the ruin was demolished and a nine-storey block of flats was erected in its place.

== Description ==
The Aronheim & Cohn Department Store was a four-storey building. The façade was divided into two parts: a larger one, with a bay window and a gable in the middle part and a smaller, single-axis one, crowned with a tented roof. The ground floor and the first two floors were almost entirely glazed with display windows adjoined by lamps with spherical shades. The roof was covered with red ceramic tiles.
