= Galeria Kaskada =

Shopping mall in Szczecin, Poland

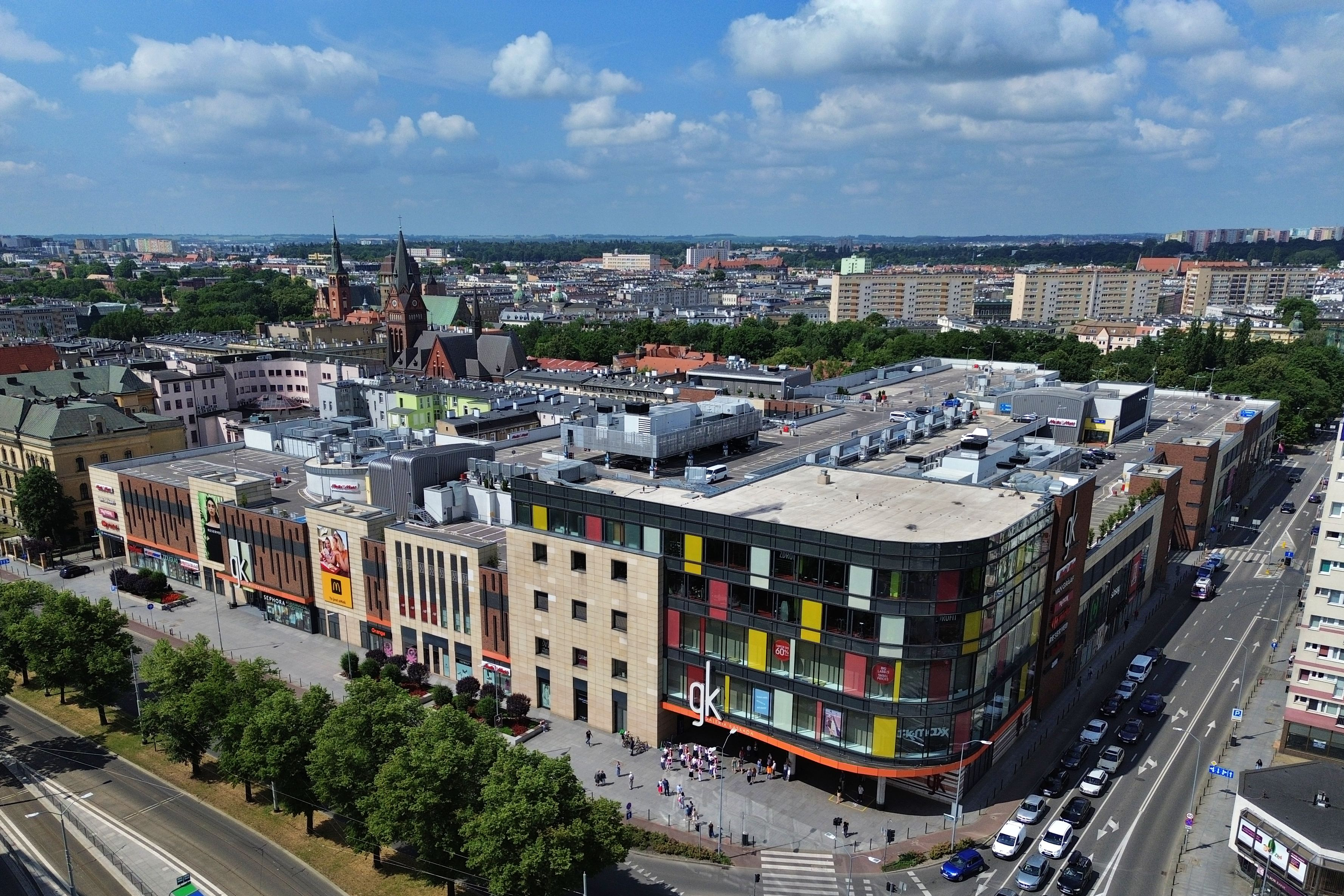
- The building in 2023.
- Interactive map of the Galeria Kaskada area

General information
- Type: Shopping mall
- Architectural style: Modern architecture
- Location: Szczecin, Poland, 36 Independence Avenue
- Coordinates: 53°25′42″N 14°33′01″E
- Construction started: 2008
- Completed: 28 September 2011
- Owner: ECE Polska

Height
- Height: 25 metres (82 ft)

Technical details
- Floor count: 5

Design and construction
- Architecture firm: Urbicon
- Main contractor: Strabag Polska

Website
- www.galeria-kaskada.pl

Galeria Kaskada (Polish: [ɡaˈlɛ.rja kasˈka.da]; lit. 'Cascade Mall') is a shopping mall in Szczecin, Poland, located at 36 Independence Avenue. The building was opened on 28 September 2011, and belongs to the ECE Polska company.

== History ==
The building was built in place of three other buildings, the Odra Clothing Industry Factory, the Pleciuga Puppet Theatre building, and the Kaskada restaurant complex. The last on the list burned down on 27 April 1981, and became the namesake of the shopping centre.

The construction had been commissioned by ECE Polska company, with the building being designed by Urbicon architecture firm, and constructed by Strabag Polska. The investment cost 180,000,000 euros. The construction begun in 2008, and lasted until 2011. The building was opened on 28 September 2011.

The remains of the 18th-century wall of the city fortification, were found during the earthworks. Following the renovation, the best preserved fragments of the wall were left on the display inside the building, in its underground section.

== Description ==
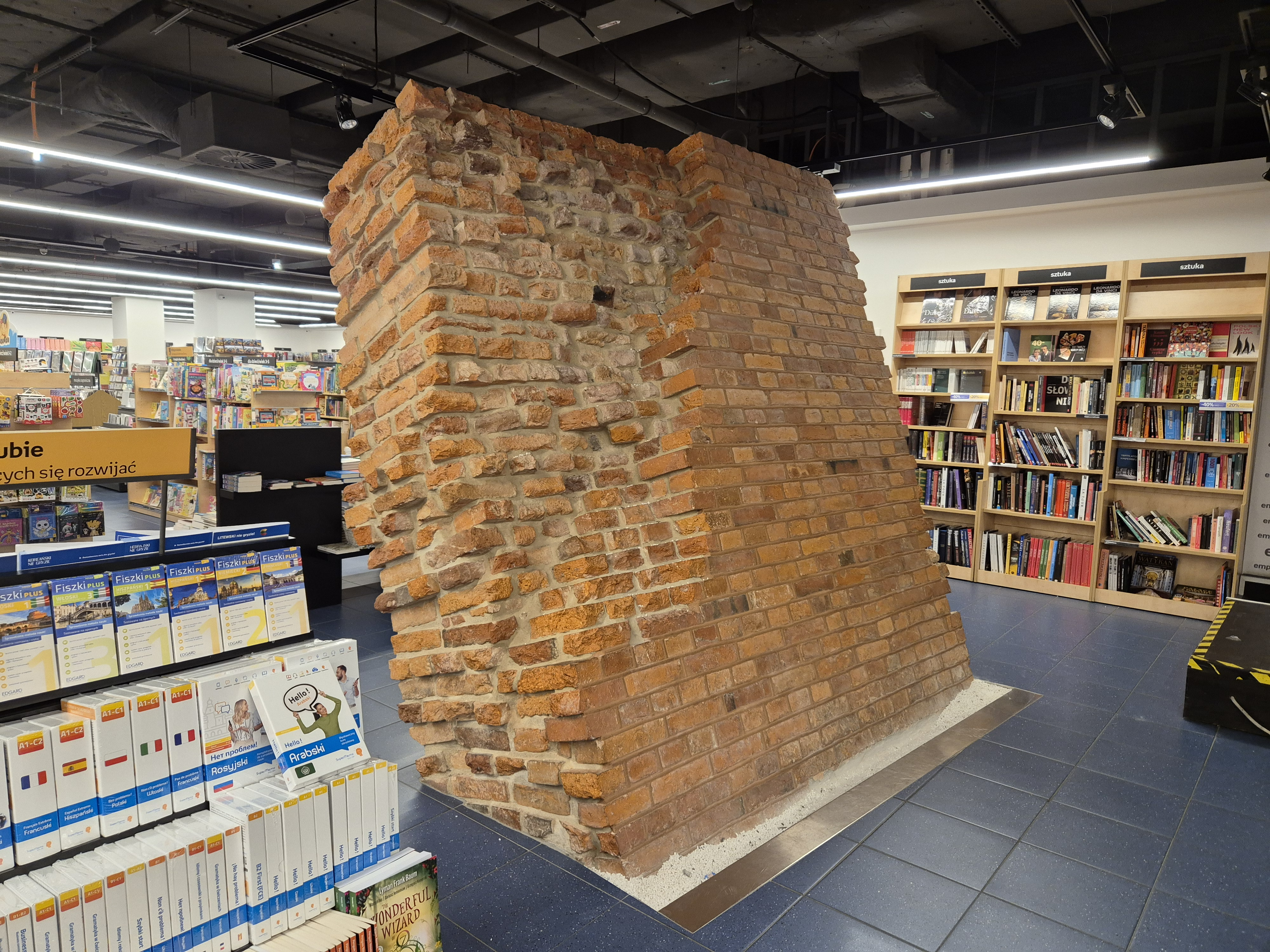
A fragment of the 18th-century fortifications wall, preserved in the underground section of the building.

The building is designed in a modern architecture style. It consists of three rotundas, with dome roofs. Each rotunda has a different colour, each representing a different building that used to exist in the location of the shopping center. They are, blue, repressing jeans manufactured in the Odra Clothing Industry Factory, red, representing the curtain in the Pleciuga Puppet Theatre, and yellow, representing the champagne and parties in the Kaskada Restaurant Complex. The shape of the building is based on the Kaskada Restaurant Complex.

The shopping center hosts 140 stores, a gym, a charging station, and a car wash. It has the area of 120,000 m^{2} (1,300,000 sq ft), of which, 43,000 m^{2} (460,000 sq ft) includes the shopping area. It has five above-ground levels, and one level underground. The building is 25 metres (82 ft) tall. The building also has a multi-story car park, with 1,000 car spaces.
