= Friedrich Pitzschky Tenement =

Tenement house in Szczecin

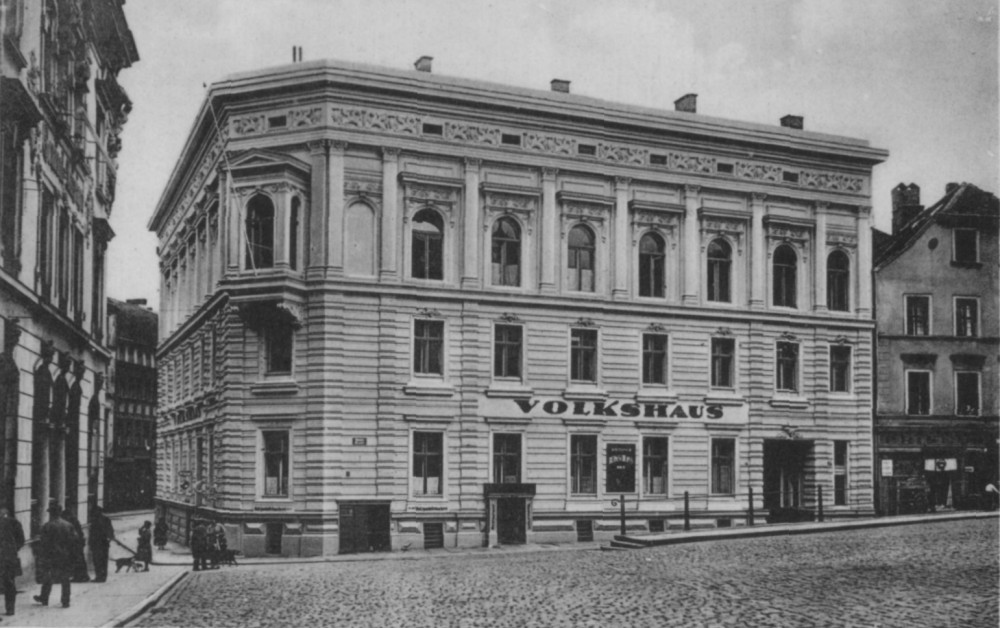
- Friedrich Pitzschky Tenement House

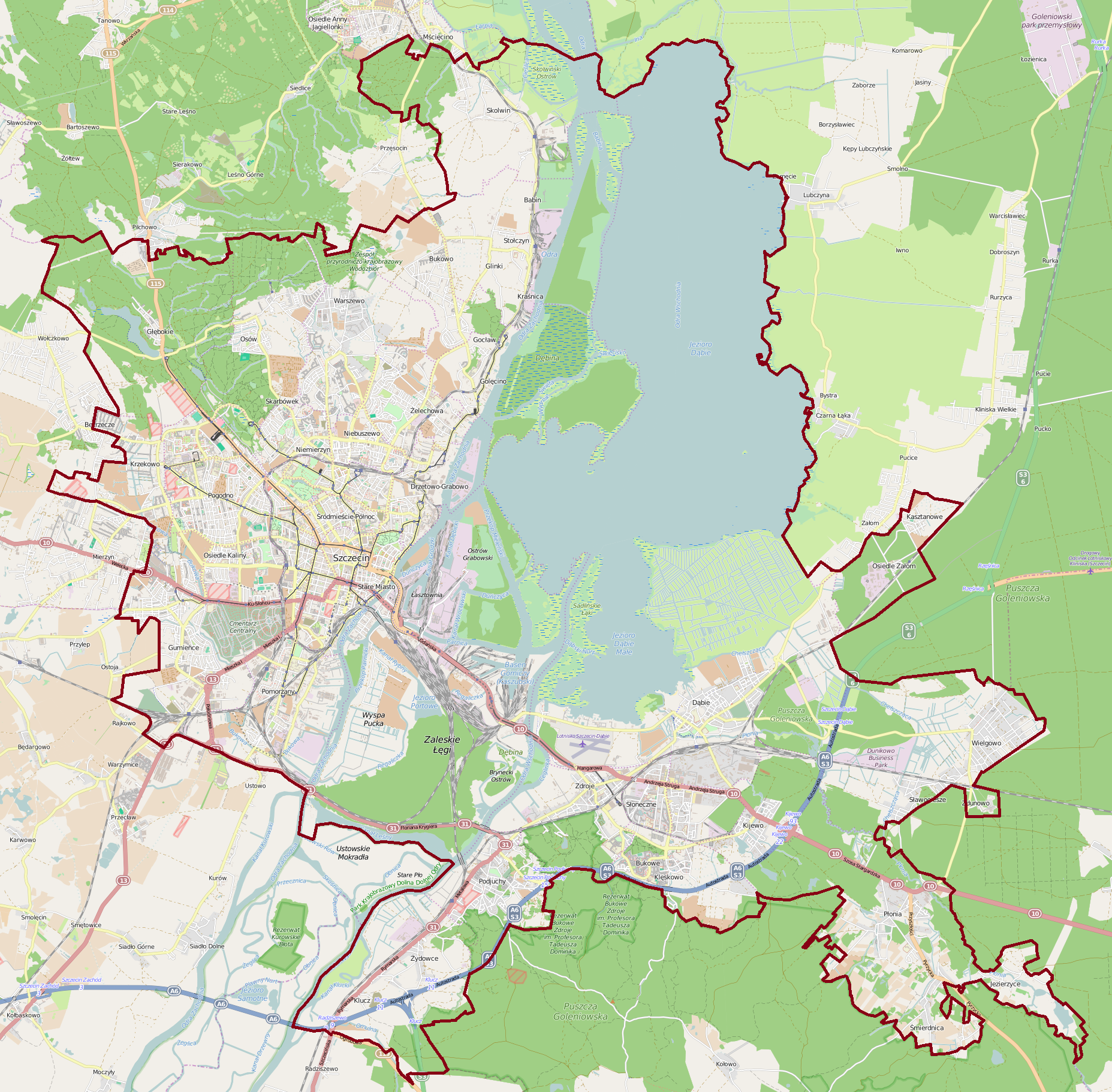
- Location within Szczecin

General information
- Type: tenement house
- Architectural style: eclecticism
- Location: Große Oderstraße 18–20, Szczecin, Poland
- Coordinates: 53°25′27.4″N 14°33′39.4″E
- Construction started: 1876
- Completed: 1877
- Destroyed: 1944
- Owner: Friedrich Pitzschky (first)

Technical details
- Material: brick
- Floor count: 4

The Friedrich Pitzschky Tenement (German: Mietshaus Friedrich Pitzschky; Polish: Kamienica Friedricha Pitzschky’ego), also known as the People's House (German: Volkshaus), was a tenement house, which was located at the corner of today's Wielka Odrzańska Street and New Market, in the Old Town, in the Centre district. It was destroyed in a bombardment in 1944.

== History ==
The design of the building was created in 1875 to order of Friedrich Emil Pitzschky, the owner of an insurance company. The building permit was granted in June 1875 and the construction work was carried out between 1876 and 1877. The tenement housed the offices of insurance and shipping companies, including the management of Pitzschky's company. On 14 June 1910 the building was sold for 192,500 marks to the society "Volkshaus". In 1939 the building became the property of the representation of workers and employers of the Deutsche Arbeitsfronts Gau Pommern. In 1944 the building was damaged in a bombardment and was never rebuilt. In the 1990s, as part of the revitalisation of Podzamcze (lower Old Town below the Ducal Castle), a post-modern building was erected on original foundation. Formally it is one building, but its façade consists of three different segments, imitating separate houses.

== Description ==
The tenement house was a three-storey building with a basement. The façade of the ground floor and the first floor was decorated with bossage. The windows of the upper floor separated Ionic pilasters. The corner of the building was distinguished by a bay window on the third floor. A frieze with small windows located between the third floor and the roof.
