= Grey Castle =

Tenement house in Szczecin

Grey Castle in Szczecin
- Szary Zamek w Szczecinie
- Grey Castle seen from the former Königsplatz (nowadays Żołnierza Polskiego Square)
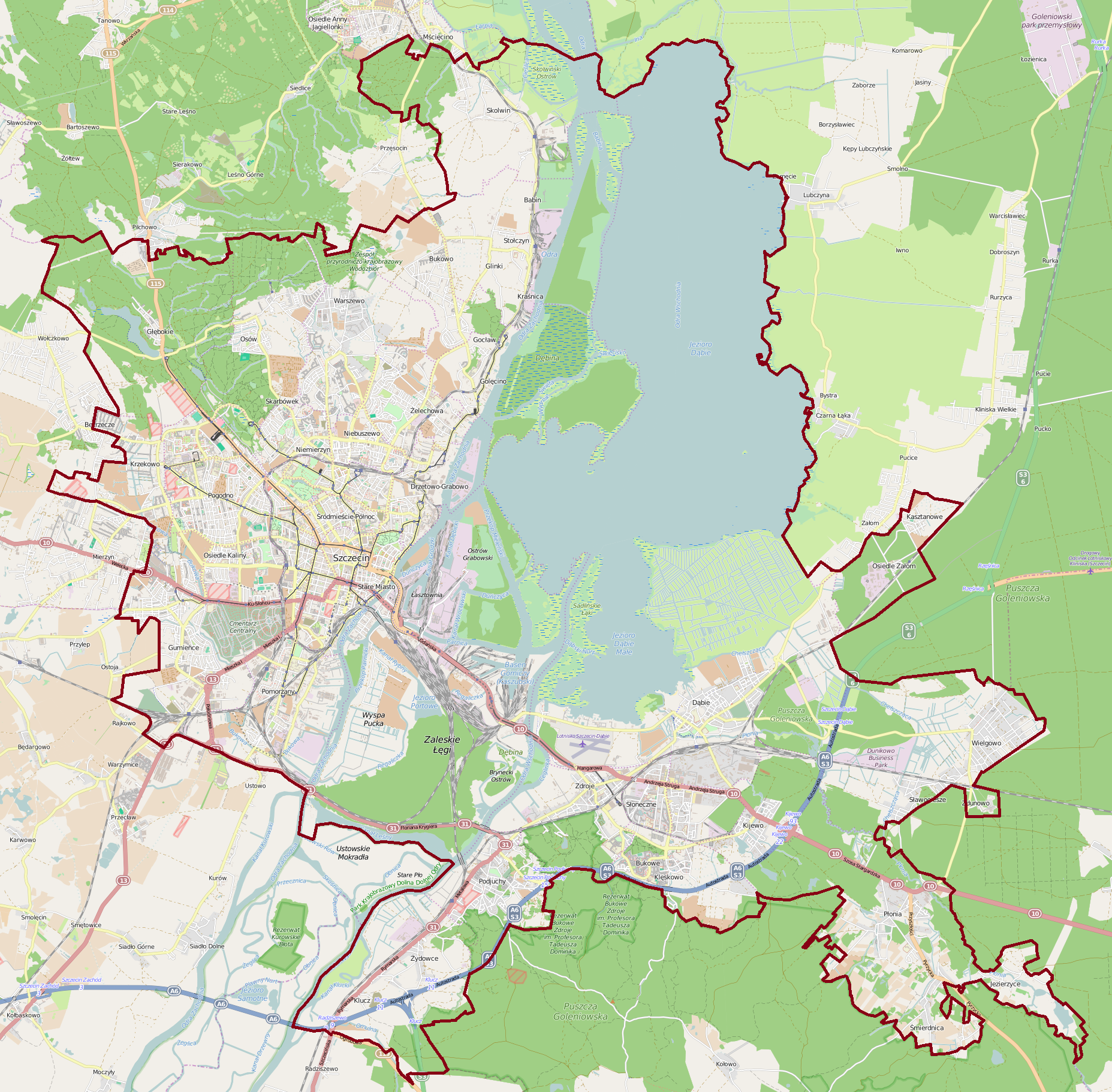
- Location within Szczecin
- Former names: Graues Schloß

General information
- Type: tenement house
- Location: Königsplatz 1, Szczecin, Poland
- Coordinates: 53.42828°N 14.55285°E
- Construction started: 1904
- Completed: 1905
- Destroyed: 1944

Technical details
- Material: brick
- Floor count: 4

Other information
- Public transit: trams

The Grey Castle (German: Graues Schloß, Polish: Szary Zamek, Polish pronunciation: [ˈʃarɨ ˈzãmɛk]) was a tenement house in Szczecin, which was located at the corner of today's Polish Soldier Square and Independence Avenue, on the north-western edge of the Old Town, in the Centre district. It was destroyed during World War II.

== History ==
The Grey Castle was built between 1904 and 1905 on the site of former barracks, existing between 1729 and 1903. The ground floor housed retail outlets as well as restaurants and coffeehouses.

The building was bombed by the British Royal Air Force on 5/6 January 1944. Due to extensive damage, the building was demolished before the end of World War II. At the turn of the 1960s and 1970s, the Grey Castle was replaced by two twin blocks of flats designed by Alina Bursze, Teodor Bursze, Stanisław Płoski and Roman Szymborski.

== Description ==
The tenement was a four-storey corner building. The façade facing Polish Soldier Square had six axes, with the two middle axes situated in an avant-corps topped with a triangular gable with pinnacles. Balconies adjoined both sides of the avant-corps. The corners of the building had the form of angular towers covered with the tented roof. The façades of the side wings of the building were 8-axial. The three outer axes of the first and second floor of both side wings were located in bay windows. The tenement house was covered with a mansard roof, which was accentuated with a tower. The tower had a two-part tented roof. The tented roof housed an observation deck.
