= Pomeranian Landowners Palace =

Palace in Szczecin, Poland

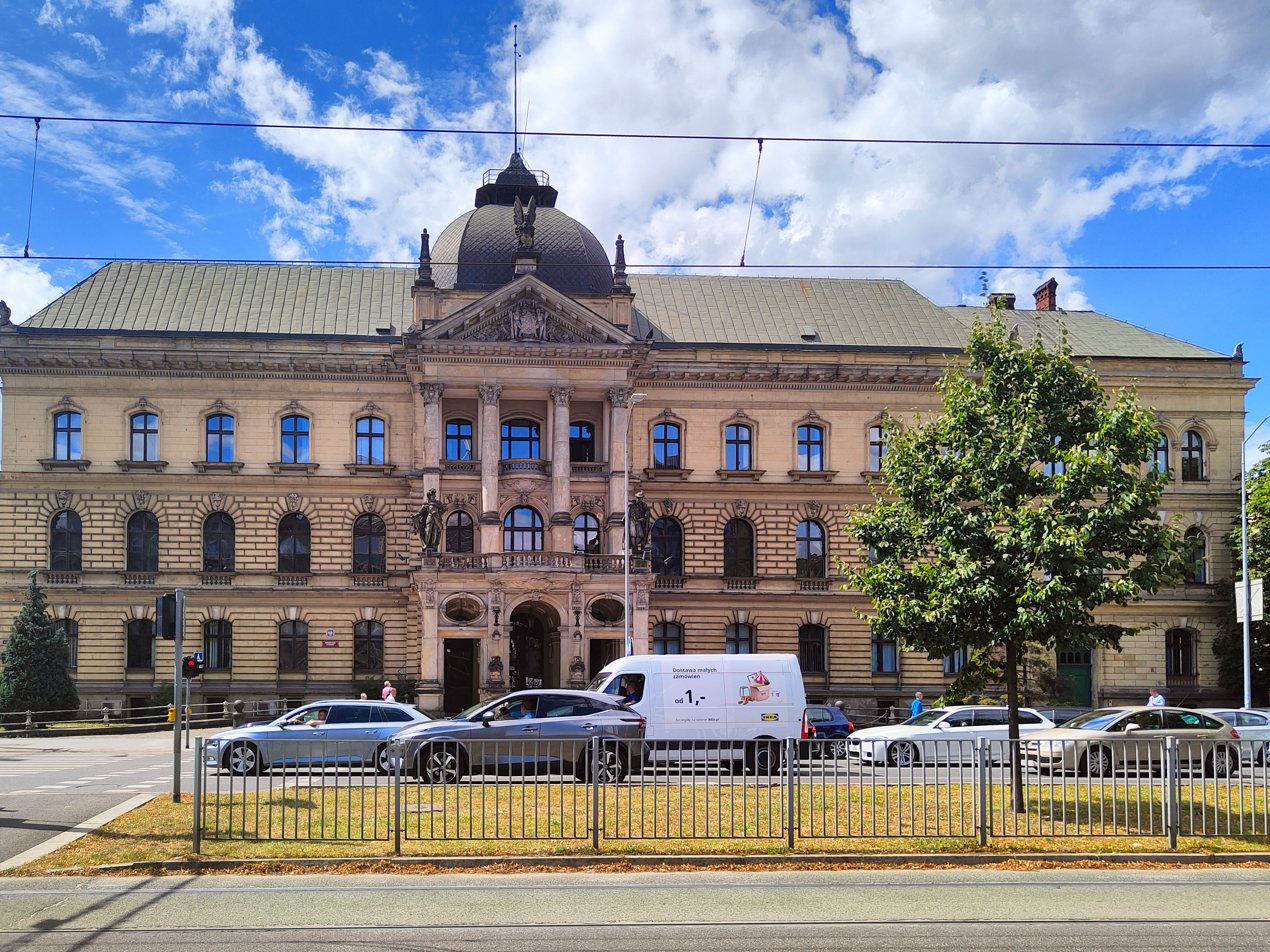
- The building in 2023.
- Interactive map of the Pomeranian Landowners Palace area

General information
- Type: Palace
- Architectural style: Baroque Revival
- Location: Szczecin, Poland, 40 Independence Avenue
- Coordinates: 53°25′37.16″N 14°33′03.70″E
- Construction started: 1893
- Completed: 1895

Design and construction
- Architect: Emil Drews

The Pomeranian Landowners Palace (Polish: Pałac Ziemstwa Pomorskiego), also known as the General Landscape Administration of Pomerania Building (German: Gebäude der Pommersche Generallandschaftsdirektion), is a historical Baroque Revival palace in Szczecin, Poland, located at 40 Independence Avenue in the neighbourhood of Centrum. It was designed by Emil Drews, and constructed between 1893 and 1895, as the headquarters of the General Landscape Administration of Pomerania and the Pomeranian Rural Bank. Since 2016, it houses the Faculty of Music of the Szczecin Art Academy.

== History ==
The building was designed by Szczecin-based architect Emil Drews in the Baroque Revival style. It was constructed between 1883 and 1895, in place of the Royal Bastion, which was part of the city fortifications. The building became headquarters of the General Landscape Administration of Pomerania (German: Pommersche Generallandschaftsdirektion), an organization of the wealthy landowners of the Province of Pomerania. It also housed the Pomeranian Rural Bank (German: Pommersche Landschaft), a mortgage bank run by the organization.

Following the end of the Second World War, the building became regional headquarters of the Postal Savings Bank, which was replaced by the PKO Bank Polski in 1948, remaining there until 2014. Afterwards, it was used by economic schools, before being acquired by the Szczecin Art Academy in 2016, to house its Faculty of Music.

In 1976, it received the status of a protected cultural property.

== Characteristics ==
The palace has richly decorated Baroque Revival façade and two wings of different lengths on its sides. Its main entrance, located in the middle section, consists of decorative avant-corps with a porch, and a balcony above it, with two statues depicting a knight and a farmer. At the top is a tympanum, held by columns, featuring a coat of arms of Pomerania with nine fields in a shield, held by three gladiators. Above it, is a sculpture of a griffin holding a shield with a ligature of letters F and R, representing Frederick the Great, the King of Prussia and the Elector of Brandenburg from 1740 to 1786. It stands of a pedestal with inscribed date 1781, referring to the founding of the General Landscape Administration of Pomerania. The façade of the first and second storeys are decorated with bossage. Many of the rooms maintain original decorations.

== Gallery ==
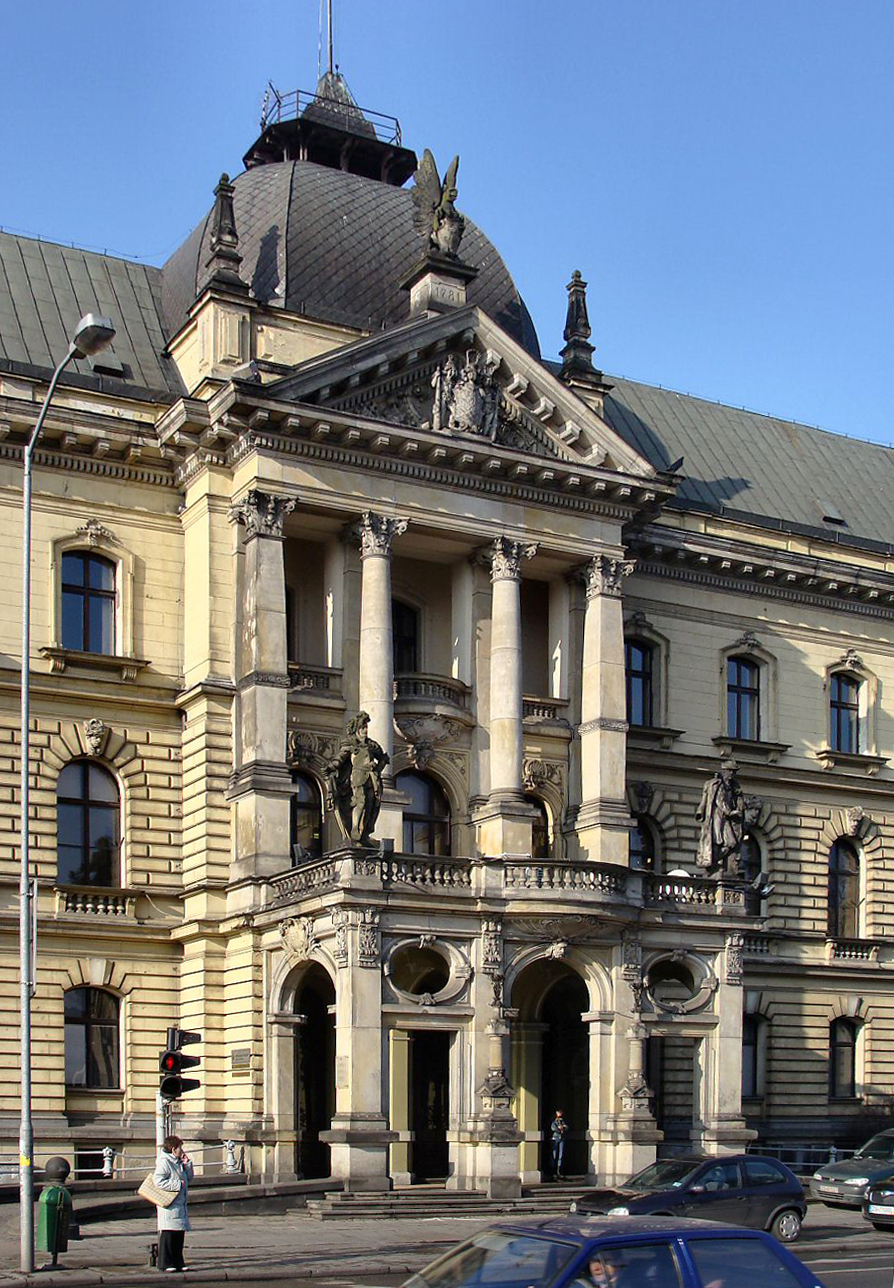
The avant-corps.

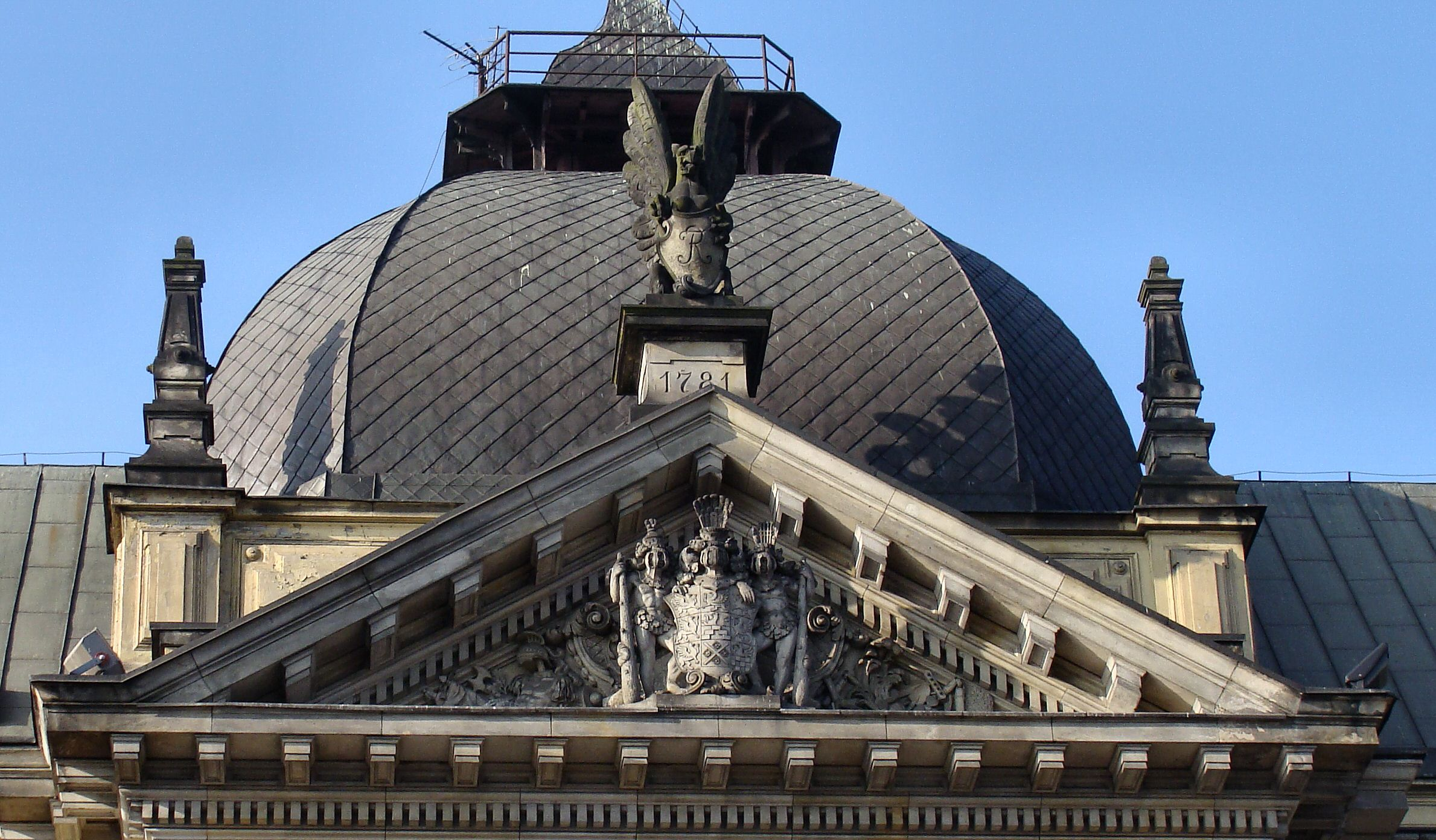
The tympanum.

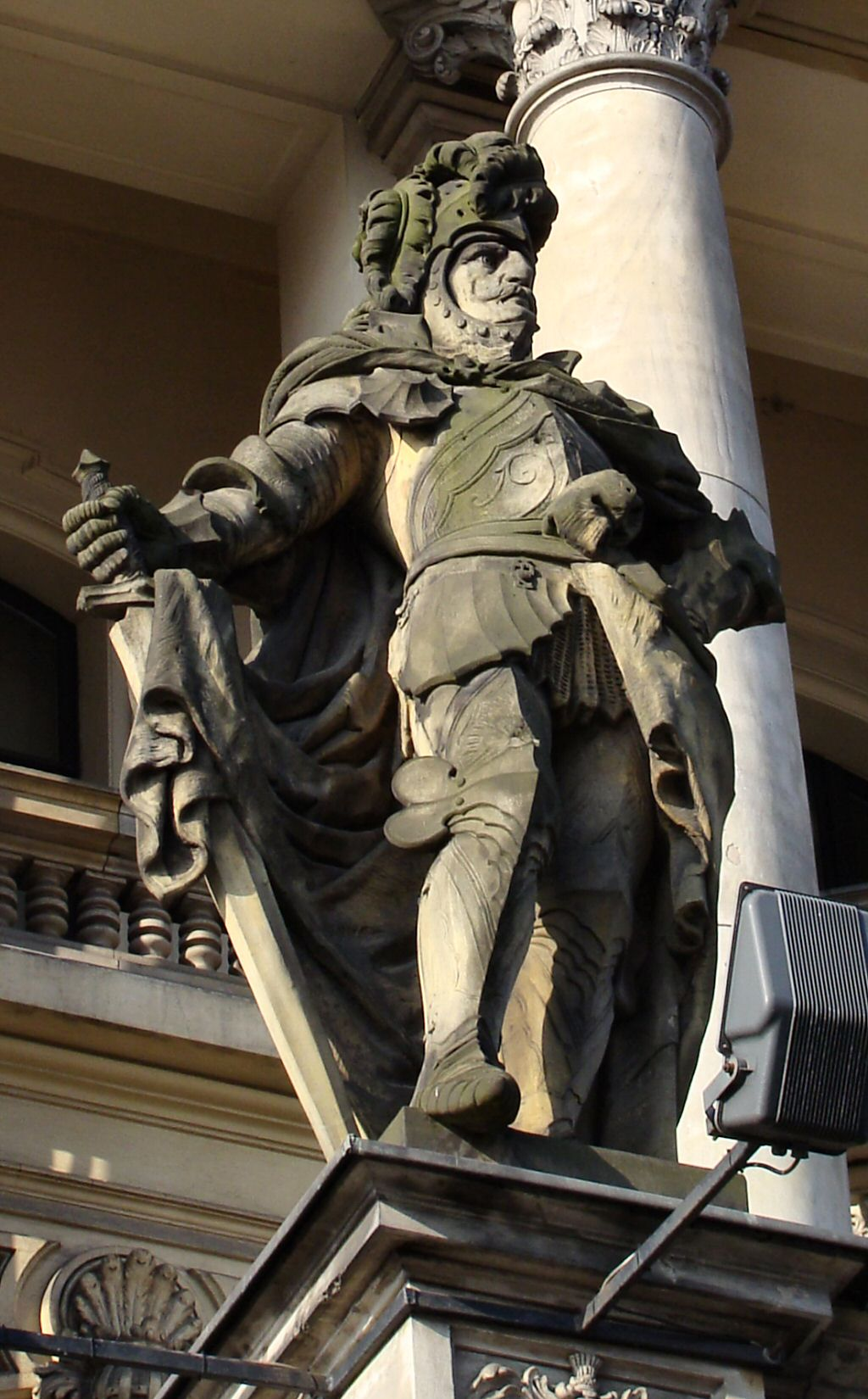
The sculpture of a knight.

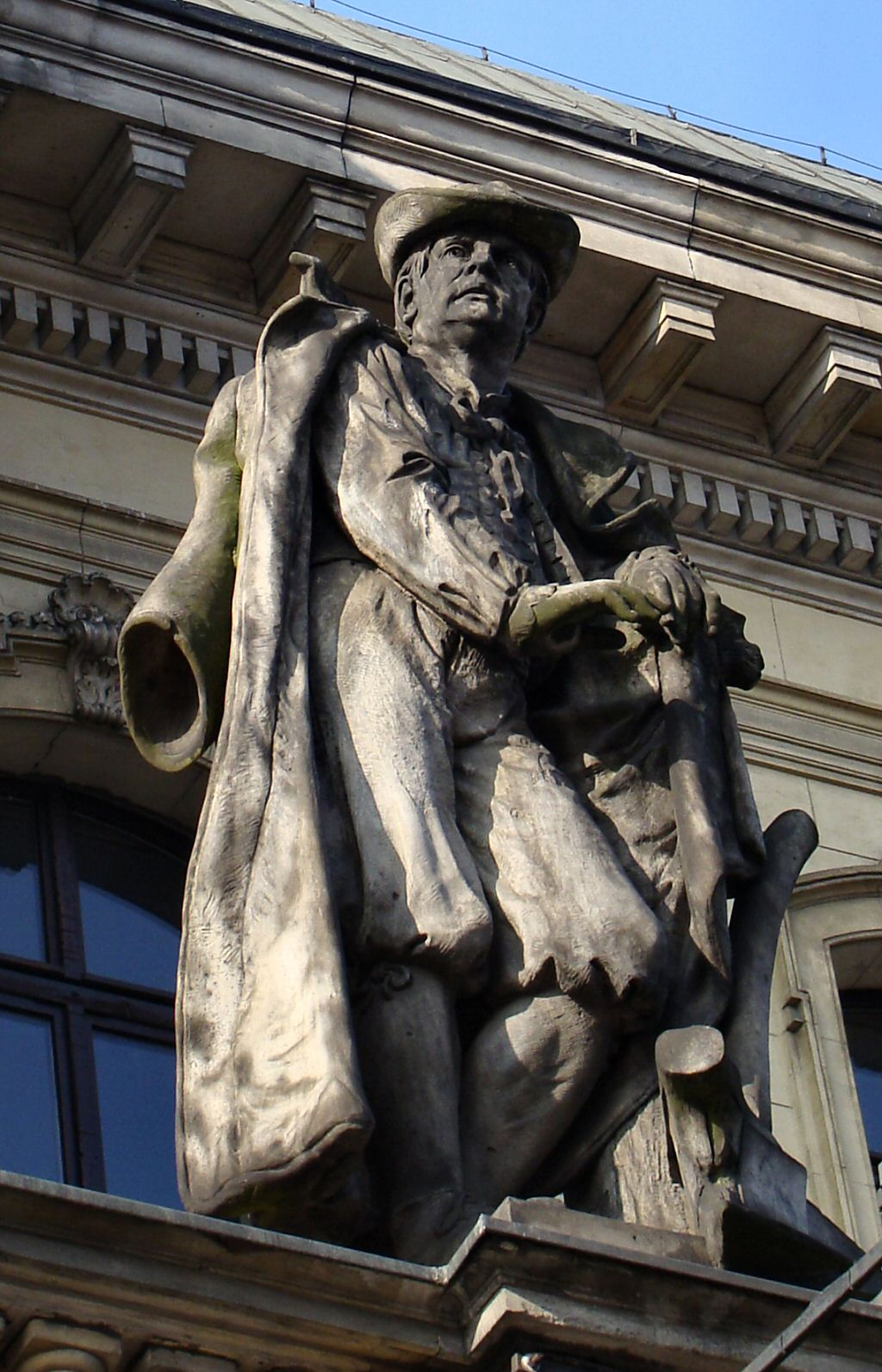
The sculpture of a farmer.

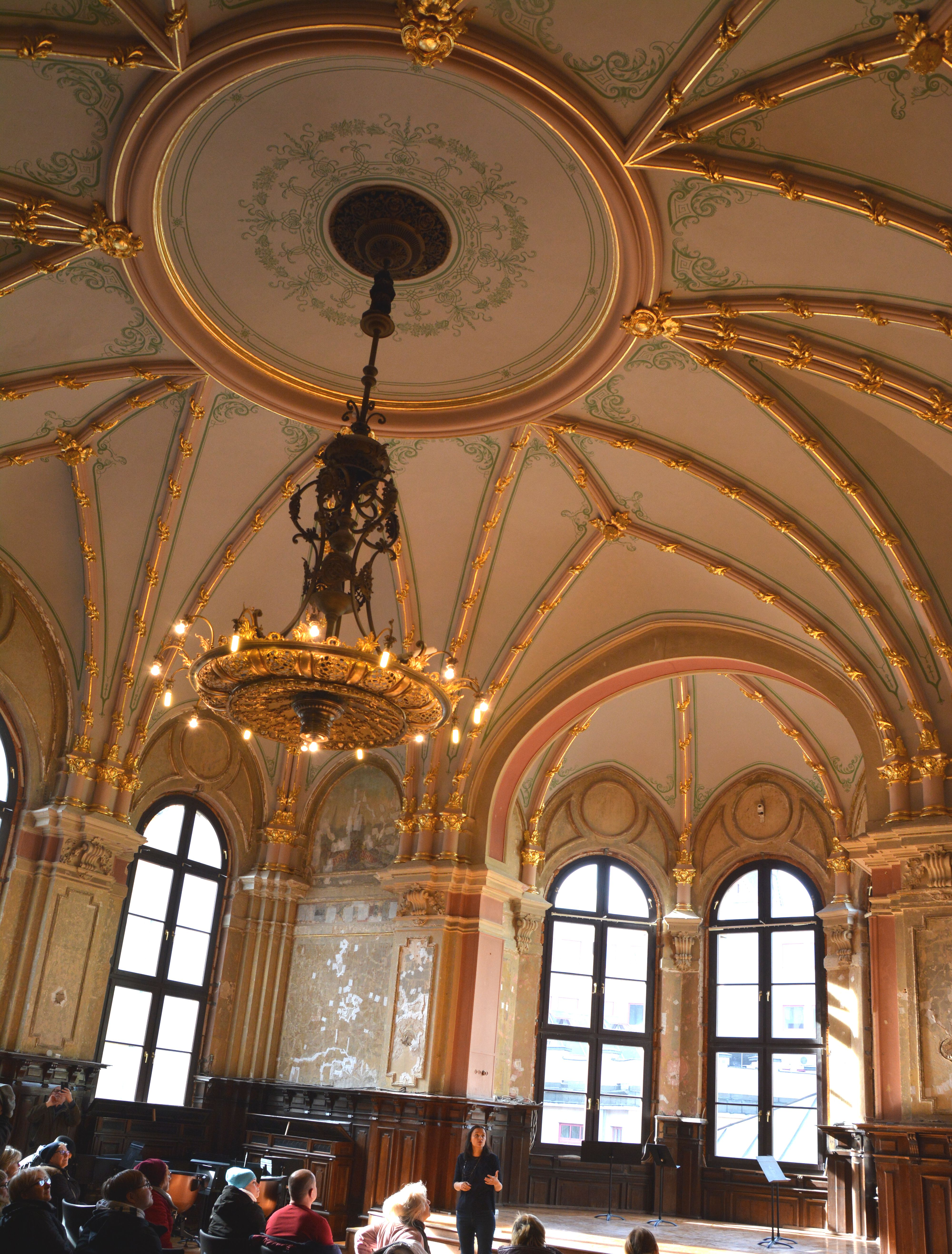
The former main meeting hall.
