= Old Town, Szczecin =

Old Town Old Town
- municipal neighbourhood
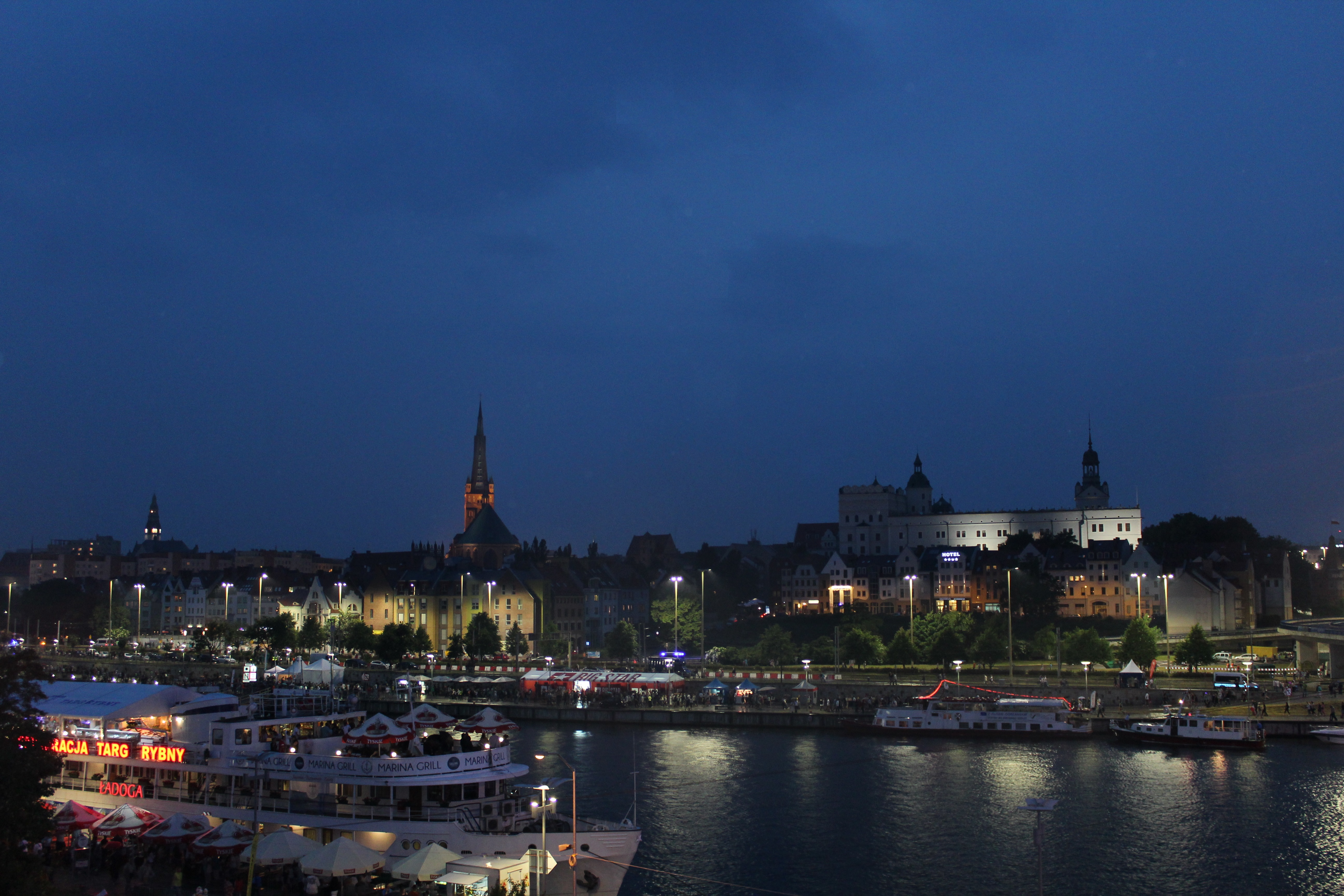
- Old Town at night

- Location within Szczecin

- Old Town within former city walls
- Coordinates: 53.4284°N 14.5599°E
- Country: Poland
- Voivodeship: West Pomeranian
- City: Szczecin
- District: Śródmieście
- Founded: 1243
- Incorporated as a neighbourhood: 1990
- Founder: Barnim I

Government
  - Body: Neighbourhood council
  - Council chairman: Małgorzata Zychowicz-Prus

Area
  - Total: 1.1 km^{2} (0.42 sq mi)

Population (2021)
  - Total: 3,901
  - Density: 3,500/km^{2} (9,200/sq mi)
- Time zones: UTC+01:00 (UTC)
- UTC+02:00 (UTC)
- Registration plates: ZS
- Dialling code: +48 91
- SIMC code: 0978556
- Website: staremiasto.osiedla.szczecin.pl

Old Town (Polish: Stare Miasto; German: Altstadt), and the core of the historic old German port city of Stettin until 1950, is a municipal neighborhood of the modern city of Szczecin, now in Poland, situated on the left bank of the Oder river. It is the oldest historical district in the city. As of March 2021 it had a population of 3,901.

== Buildings and structures ==
=== Existent ===
- Old Town Hall
- Chrobry Embankment
- Ducal Castle
- National Museum
- Szczecin Cathedral
- Szczecin Philharmonic
- Szczecin Voivodeship Office
- Stefan Żeromski Park

=== Non-existent ===
Buildings and structures destroyed during the World War II.

- Grey Castle
- Hotel Metropole
- Rudolph Karstadt Department Store
- Aronheim & Cohn Department Store
- Naumann Rosenbaum Department Store
- Leopold Juda Department Store
- Stettiner General-Anzeiger Building
- Abracham Wichenhagen Tenement House
- Friedrich Pitzschky Tenement House
- Gabriel Dahl Tenement House
- Paul Letsche Tenement House
- Konzerthaus
- Bourse of Szczecin
- Otto Secondary School for Boys
- Manzel's Fountain
- Monument to Carl Loewe

== See also ==
- Old Town Hall, Szczecin
