= Szczecin Art Academy =

Art school in Szczecin, Poland

Coordinates: 53°25′34″N 14°33′15″E

- Akademia Sztuki w Szczecinie
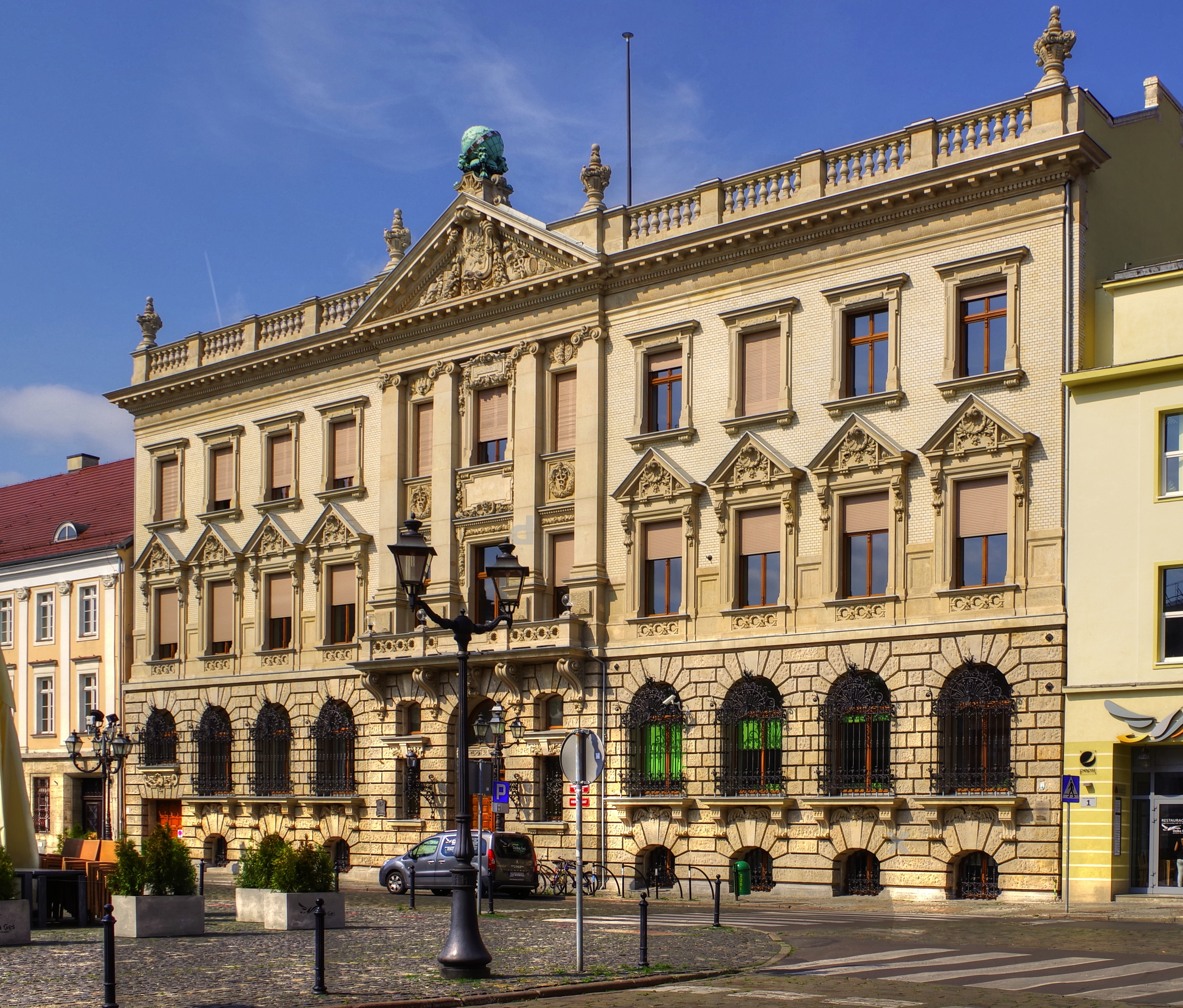
- Type: Public
- Established: 2010
- Rector: Ryszard Handke
- Students: 400
- Location: Szczecin, Poland
- Website: www.akademiasztuki.eu

The Szczecin Art Academy (Polish: Akademia Sztuki w Szczecinie) is a public university in Szczecin, Poland, founded on September 1, 2010. The profile of the university includes both music and visual arts with programmes offered in two different art disciplines. It consists of 4 faculties with BA and MA courses.

== Faculties ==
1. Faculty of Musical Education
2. Instrumental Faculty
3. Faculty of Visual Arts
4. Faculty of Painting and New Media
