= Szczecin =

Capital city of West Pomerania, Poland

Szczecin Stettin
- City county
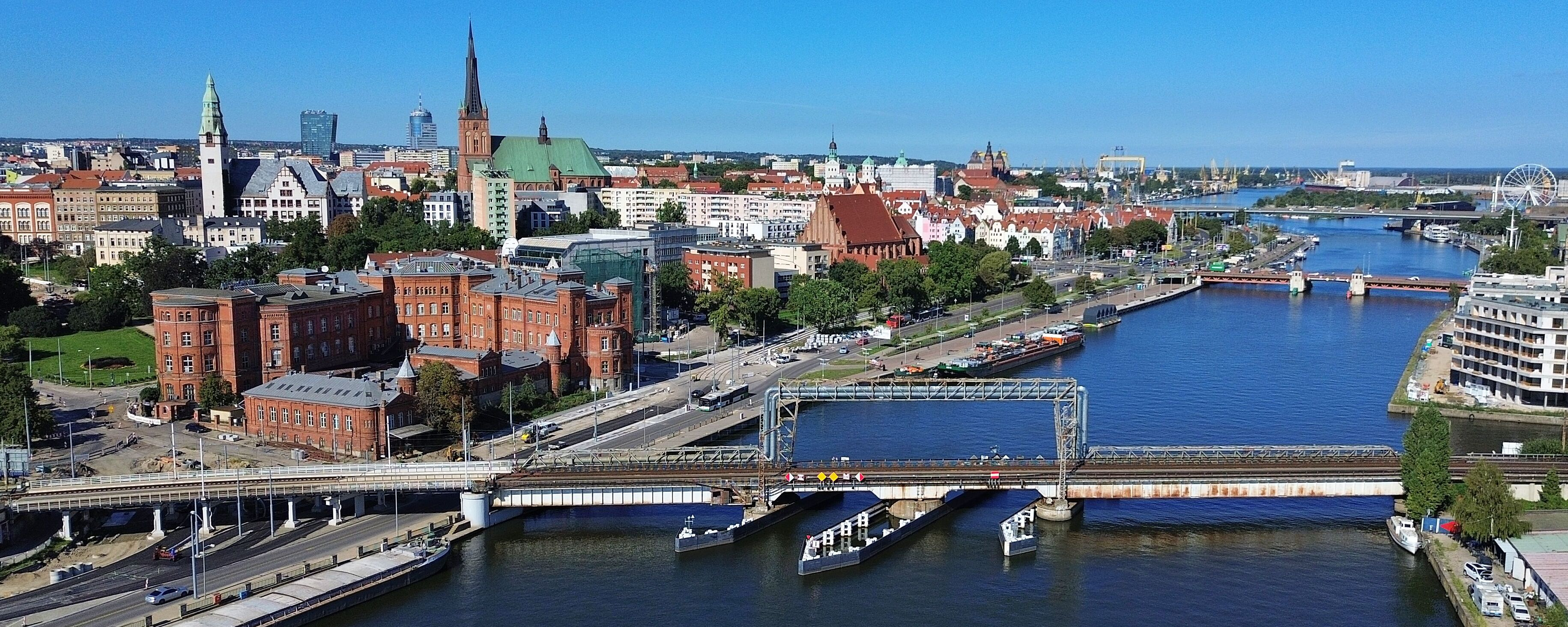
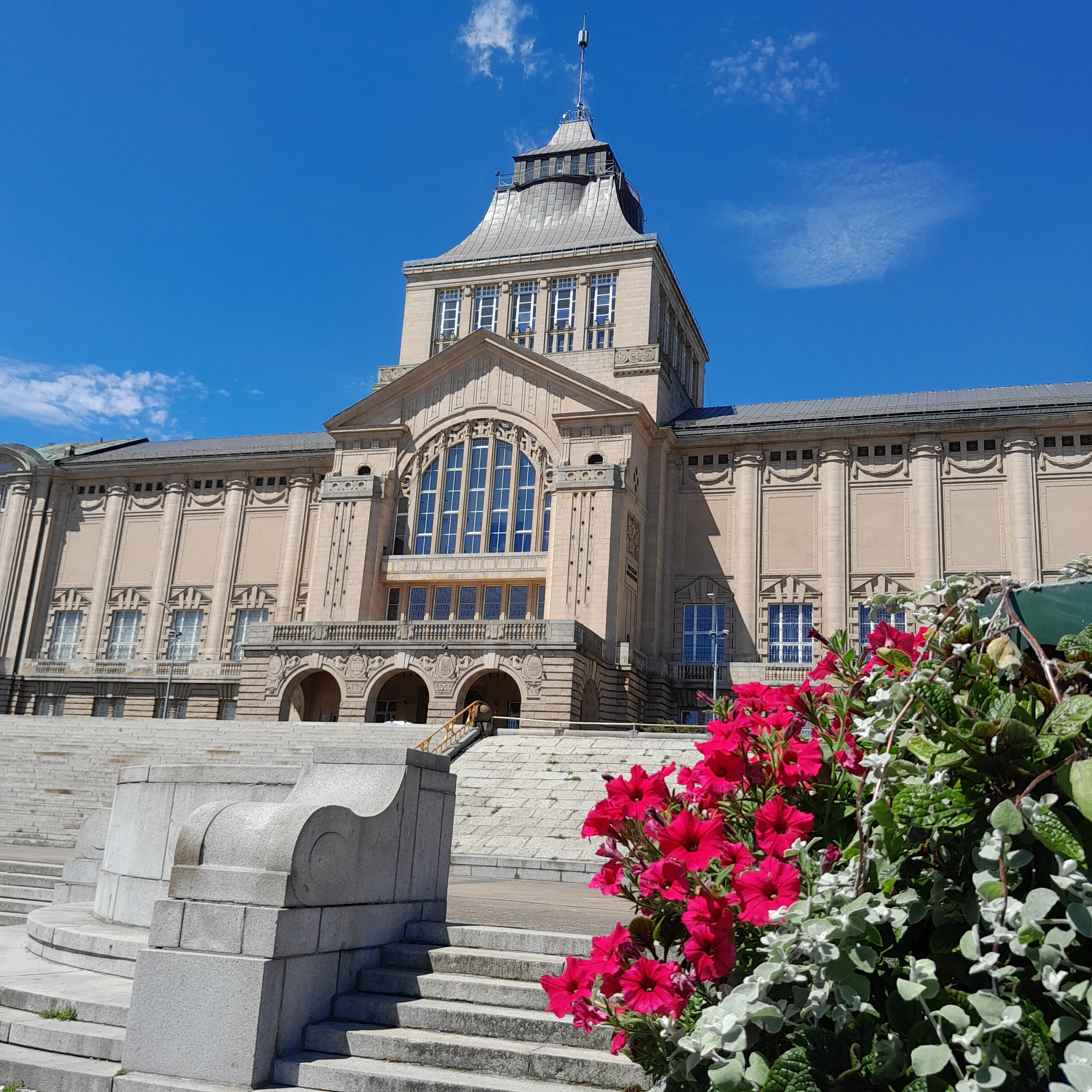
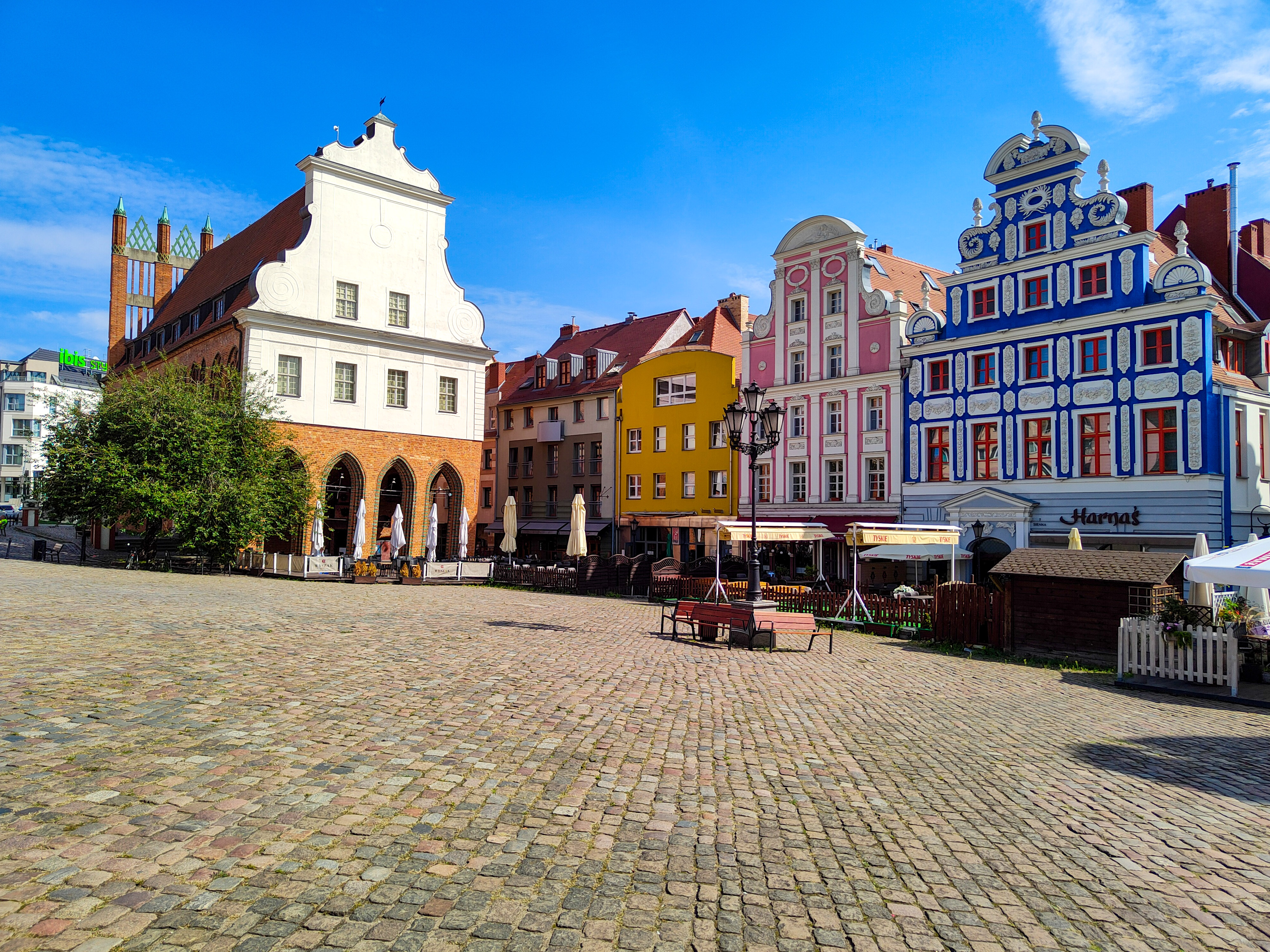
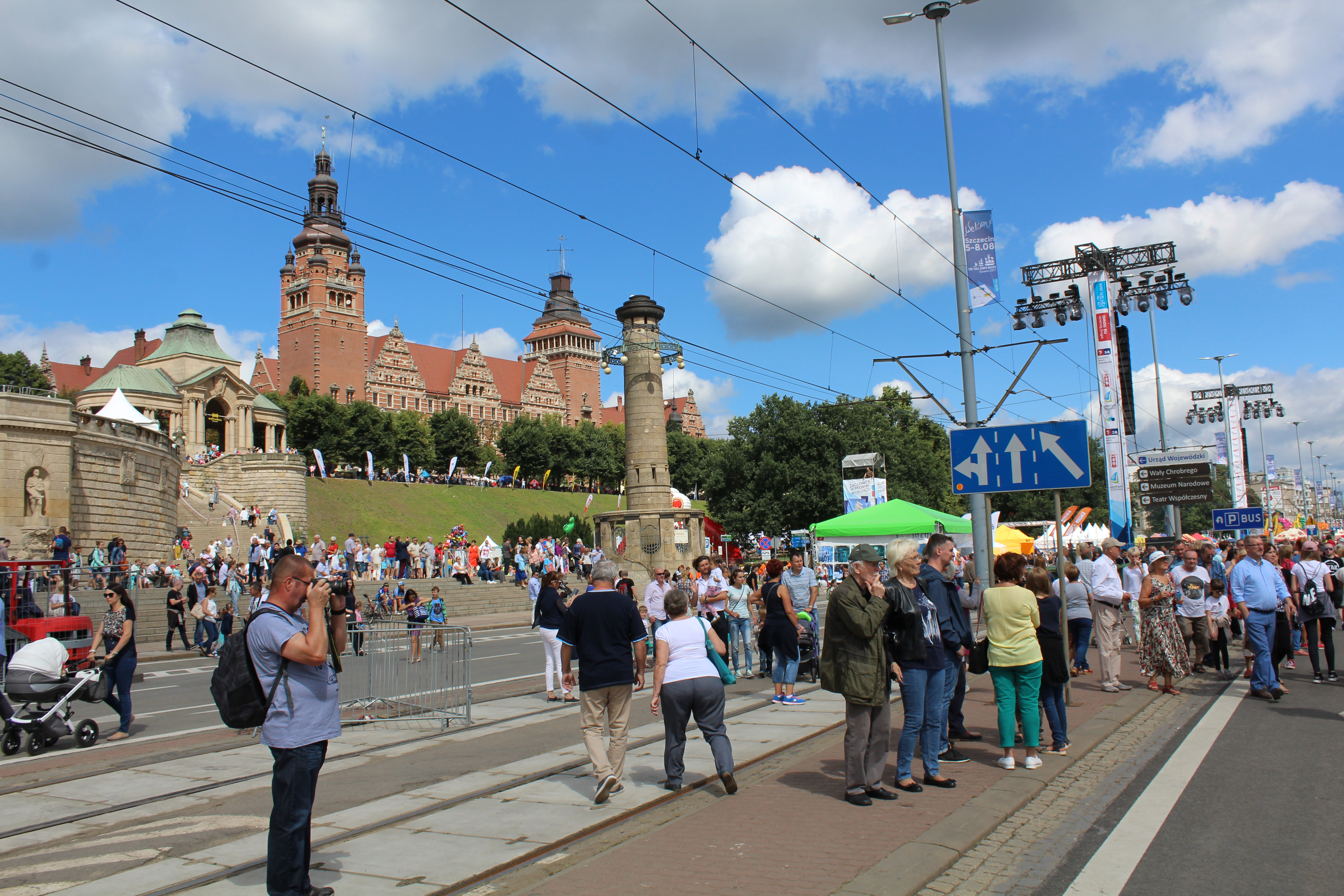
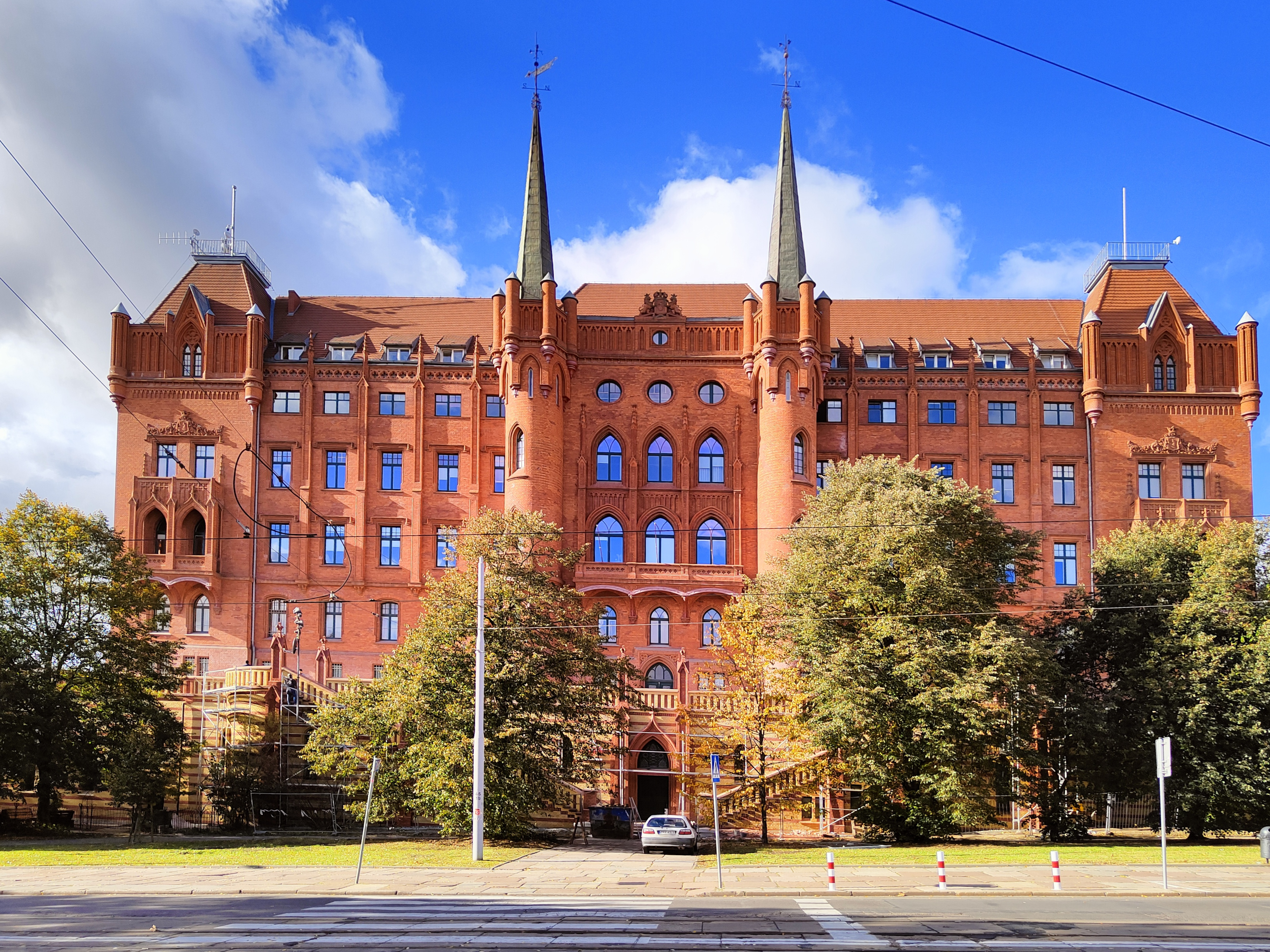
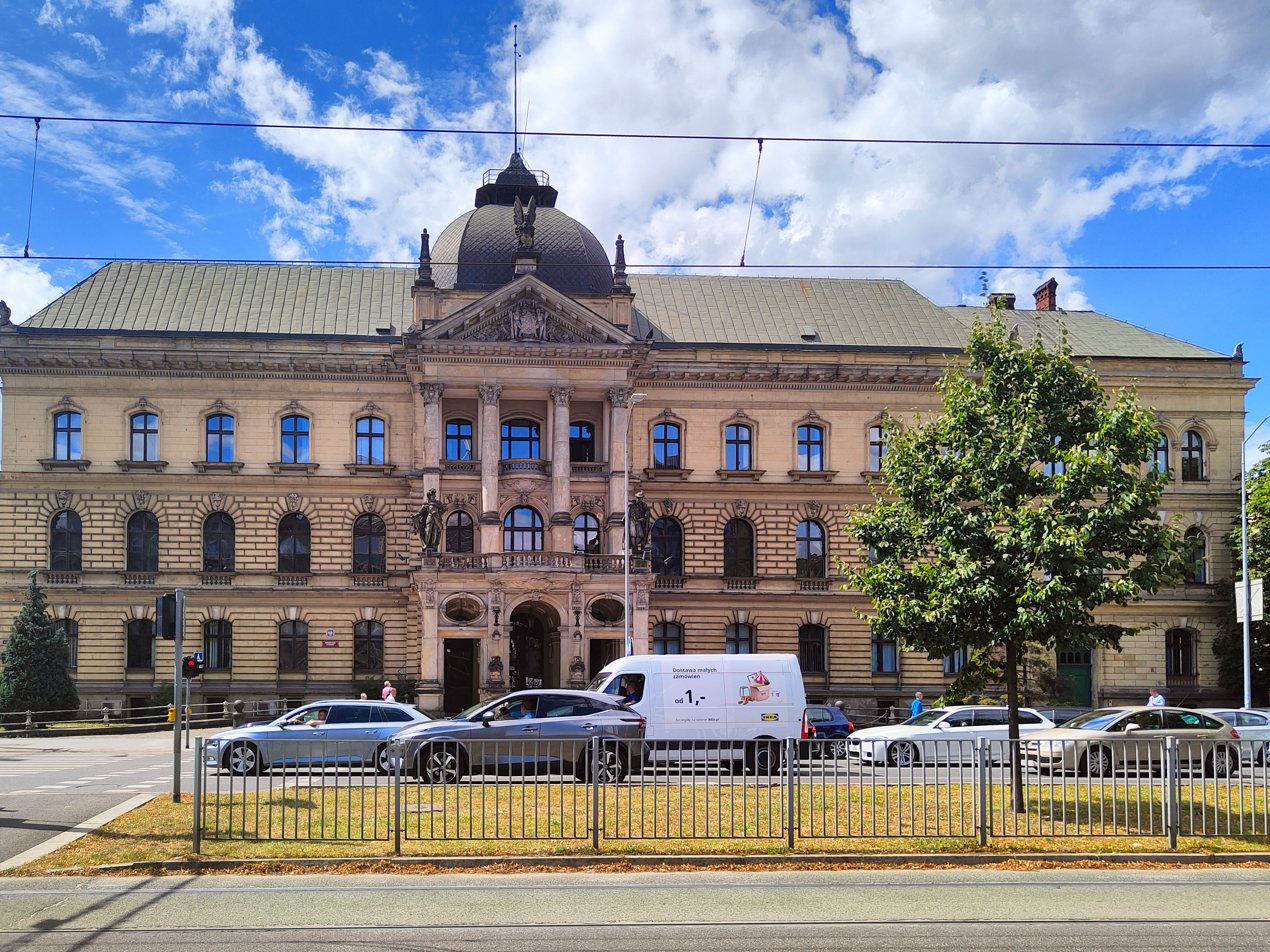
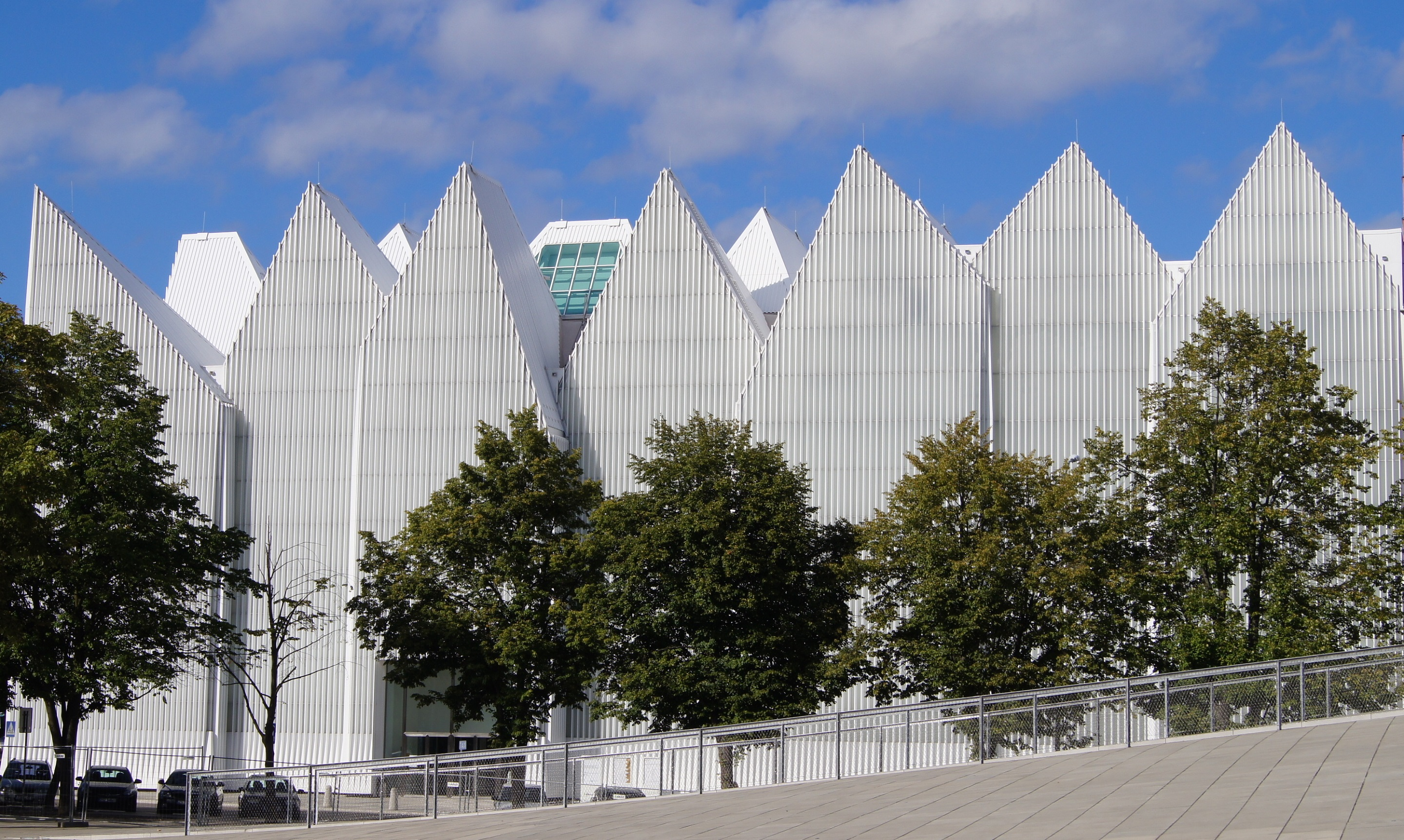
- Oder River, with the Cathedral in the distance National Museum Old Town Hall Voivodeship Office Red Town Hall Pomeranian Landowners Palace Philharmonic

- Flag Coat of arms Brandmark
- Motto: "Szczecin jest otwarty" ("Szczecin is open")
- Interactive map of Szczecin
- Location within Poland
- Coordinates: 53°25′57″N 14°32′53″E
- Country: Poland
- Voivodeship: West Pomeranian
- County: City county
- Established: 8th century
- City rights: 1243

Government
  - City mayor: Piotr Krzystek (NOWA)

Area
  - City county: 301 km^{2} (116 sq mi)
  - Metro: 2,795 km^{2} (1,079 sq mi)

Population (31 December 2021)
  - City county: 395,513 ▼ (7th)
  - Density: 1,340/km^{2} (3,500/sq mi)
  - Metro: 777,000
  - Metro density: 278/km^{2} (720/sq mi)
- Demonym(s): szczecinianin (male) szczecinianka (female) (pl)
- Time zone: UTC+1 (CET)
  - Summer (DST): UTC+2 (CEST)
- Postal code: PL-70-017 to 71–871
- Area code: +48 91
- Car plates: ZS
- Climate: Cfb
- Primary airport: Solidarity Szczecin–Goleniów Airport
- Website: www.szczecin.pl

Szczecin, (Note: English: /ˈʃtʃɛtʃiːn/ SHCHETCH-een, UK also /ˈʃtʃɛtʃɪn/ SHCHETCH-in; Polish: [ˈʂt͡ʂɛt͡ɕin].) historically known as Stettin, (Note: English: /stəˈtiːn/ stə-TEEN or /ʃtɛˈtiːn/ shteh-TEEN; German: [ʃtɛˈtiːn]; Swedish: [stɛˈtiːn].) is the capital and largest city of the West Pomeranian Voivodeship in northwestern Poland. Located near the Baltic Sea and the German border, it is a major seaport, the largest city in northwestern Poland, and the seventh-largest city in Poland. As of 31 December 2022, the population was 391,566.

Szczecin is located on the Oder River, south of the Szczecin Lagoon and the Bay of Pomerania. The city is situated along the southwestern shore of Dąbie Lake, on both sides of the Oder and on several large islands between the western and eastern branches of the river. It is also surrounded by dense forests, shrubland and heaths, chiefly the Wkrzańska Heath shared with Germany (Ueckermünde) and the Szczecin Landscape Park. Szczecin is adjacent to the town of Police and is the urban centre of the Szczecin agglomeration, an extended metropolitan area that includes communities in the German states of Brandenburg and Mecklenburg-Western Pomerania.

The city's recorded history began in the 8th century as a Lechitic Pomeranian stronghold, built at the site of the Ducal Castle. In the 10th century, Szczecin first became part of the emerging Polish state. In the following centuries it was the capital of the Duchy of Pomerania ruled by the local House of Griffin, which at various times was under the suzerainty of Poland, the Duchy of Saxony, the Holy Roman Empire and Denmark. In 1630, the city came under the control of the Swedish Empire and in 1648 became the capital of Swedish Pomerania until 1720, when it was acquired by Prussia. Following World War II the city became part of Poland again in accordance with the Potsdam Agreement, resulting in a nearly complete population exchange. Szczecin was the site of large Polish protests in 1970 and 1980. In 1980, the first agreement between the protesters and the communist regime was signed in Szczecin, which paved the way for the creation of Solidarity, which contributed to the fall of communism.

Szczecin is the administrative and industrial centre of West Pomeranian Voivodeship and is the site of the University of Szczecin, Pomeranian Medical University, Maritime University, West Pomeranian University of Technology, and Szczecin Art Academy, and the see of the Szczecin-Kamień Catholic Archdiocese. From 1999 onwards, Szczecin has served as the site of the headquarters of NATO's Multinational Corps Northeast. The city was a candidate for the European Capital of Culture in 2016. Its chief landmarks include the Szczecin Cathedral, the Ducal Castle, the National Museum and the Szczecin Philharmonic.

== Name and etymology ==
Szczecin and Stettin are the Polish and German equivalents of the same name, which is of Proto-Slavic origin, though the exact etymology is the subject of ongoing research. (Note: Spelling variants in medieval sources include: Stetin, recorded e.g. in 1133, 1159, 1177; Stetyn, recorded, e.g., in 1188, 1243; Stetim, 1237; Szcecin, 1273.; Stetina, by Herbord; Sthetynensibus or Sthetyn, 1287, in Anglicised medieval Latin. (The ending –ens–ibus means 'to the people of' in Latin.); Stetinum and Sedinum, still used in contemporary Latin language references; Stitin, recorded, e.g., in 1251, in the Annales Ryensis, in 1642; Stitinum, by Saxo Grammaticus; Stittinum; Stytin, in the Annales Colbacensis.) In her Etymological Dictionary of Geographical Names of Poland, Maria Malec lists 11 theories regarding the origin of the name, including derivations from either: an Old Slavic word for 'hill peak' (Polish: szczyt), the plant fuller's teasel (Polish: szczeć), or the personal name Szczota.

The city's name is first recorded as Stetin in a document dating from 1112 to 1118. It continued to appear in this or closely related forms (e.g. Stetyn in 1188). The name Stettin is first documented in 1253. This spelling gradually became established over the following centuries, though other variants remained in use during the High Middle Ages – such as Stettyn in 1259 and Stethin in 1271.

Other medieval names for the town are Burstaborg (in the Knytlinga saga) and Burstenburgh (in the Annals of Waldemar). These names, which literally mean 'brush burgh', are likely derived from the translation of the city's Slavic name (assuming the second derivation mentioned above).

The Latin names of the city are Sedinum or Stetinum.

== History ==
=== Middle Ages ===
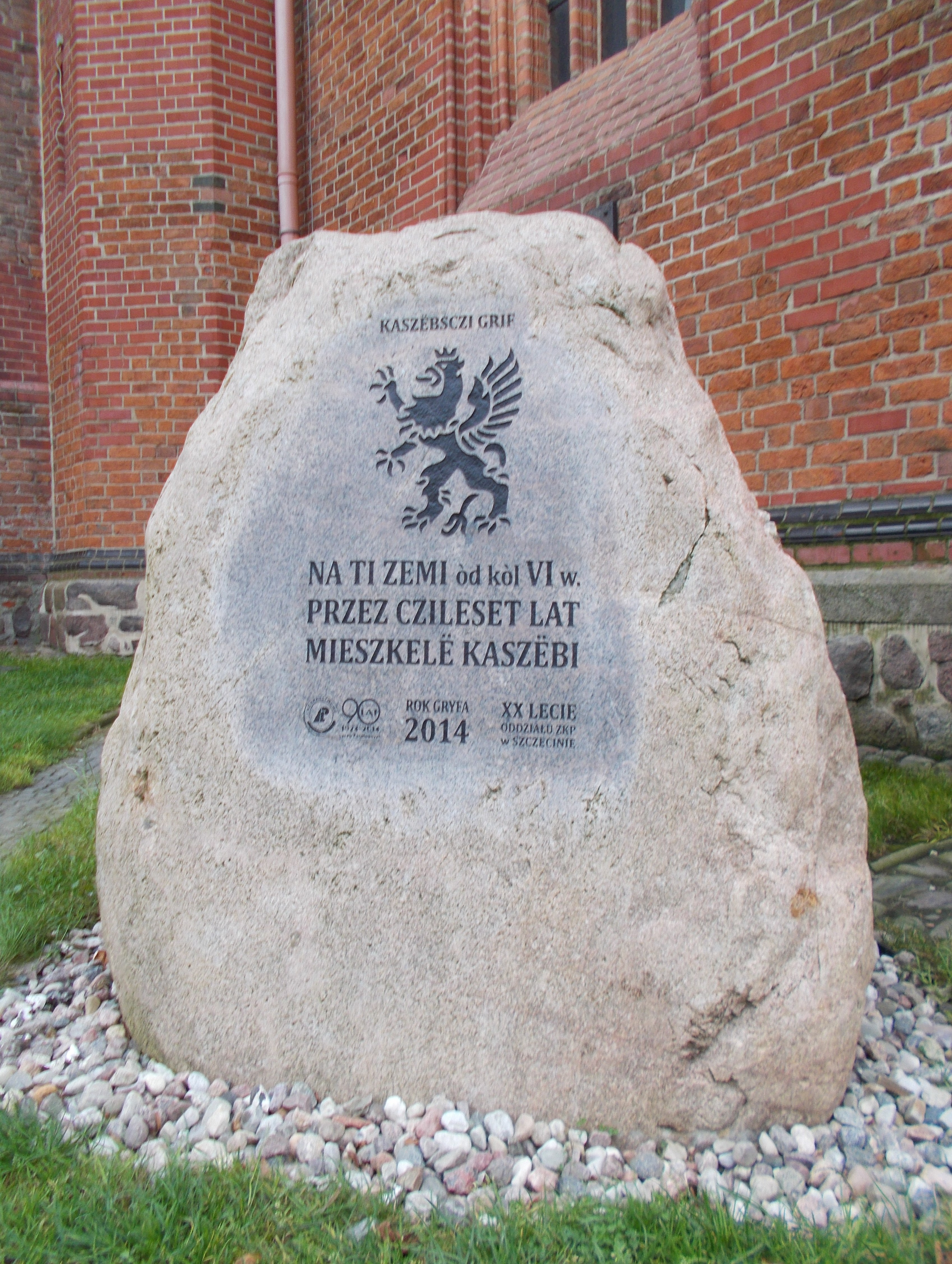
The stone near Szczecin Cathedral commemorating the Kashubians (a Lehitic people), with an image of the Pomeranian Griffin

The recorded history of Szczecin began in the eighth century, when Vikings and West Slavs settled in Pomerania. The West Slavs, or Lechites, erected a new stronghold on the site of the modern castle. Since the 9th century, the stronghold was fortified and expanded toward the Oder bank. Mieszko I of Poland took control of Pomerania during the Early Middle Ages and the region became part of Poland in the 10th century. However, Mieszko II Lambert (1025–1034) effectively lost control over the area and had to accept German suzerainty over the area of the Oder lagoon. Subsequent Polish rulers, the Holy Roman Empire, and the Liutician federation all aimed to control the territory.

After the decline of the neighbouring regional centre Wolin in the 12th century, the city became an important and powerful seaport of the Baltic Sea.

In the course of campaigns culminating in 1121–1122, Bolesław III Wrymouth, Duke of Poland, brought the city and the surrounding Pomeranian territory under his overlordship. The Pomeranian duke Wartislaw I retained his position as ruler while acknowledging Bolesław's suzerainty and undertaking to pay tribute. Bolesław sponsored the first Christianisation mission of Otto of Bamberg in 1124–1125. This mission was supported locally by Wartislaw. Otto undertook a second mission in 1128, further establishing Christianity in Pomerania. The first church of Saints Peter and Paul was founded during Otto's mission in 1124. The Poles' minted coins were commonly used in trade in this period. The population of the city at that time is estimated to be at around 5,000–9,000 people.

Polish suzerainty ended with Boleslaw's death in 1138. During the Wendish Crusade in 1147, a contingent led by the German margrave Albert the Bear, an enemy of Slavic presence in the region, papal legate, bishop Anselm of Havelberg and Konrad of Meissen besieged the town. There, a Polish contingent supplied by Mieszko III the Old joined the crusaders. However, the citizens had placed crosses around the fortifications, indicating they already had been Christianised. Duke Ratibor I of Pomerania, negotiated the disbanding of the crusading forces.

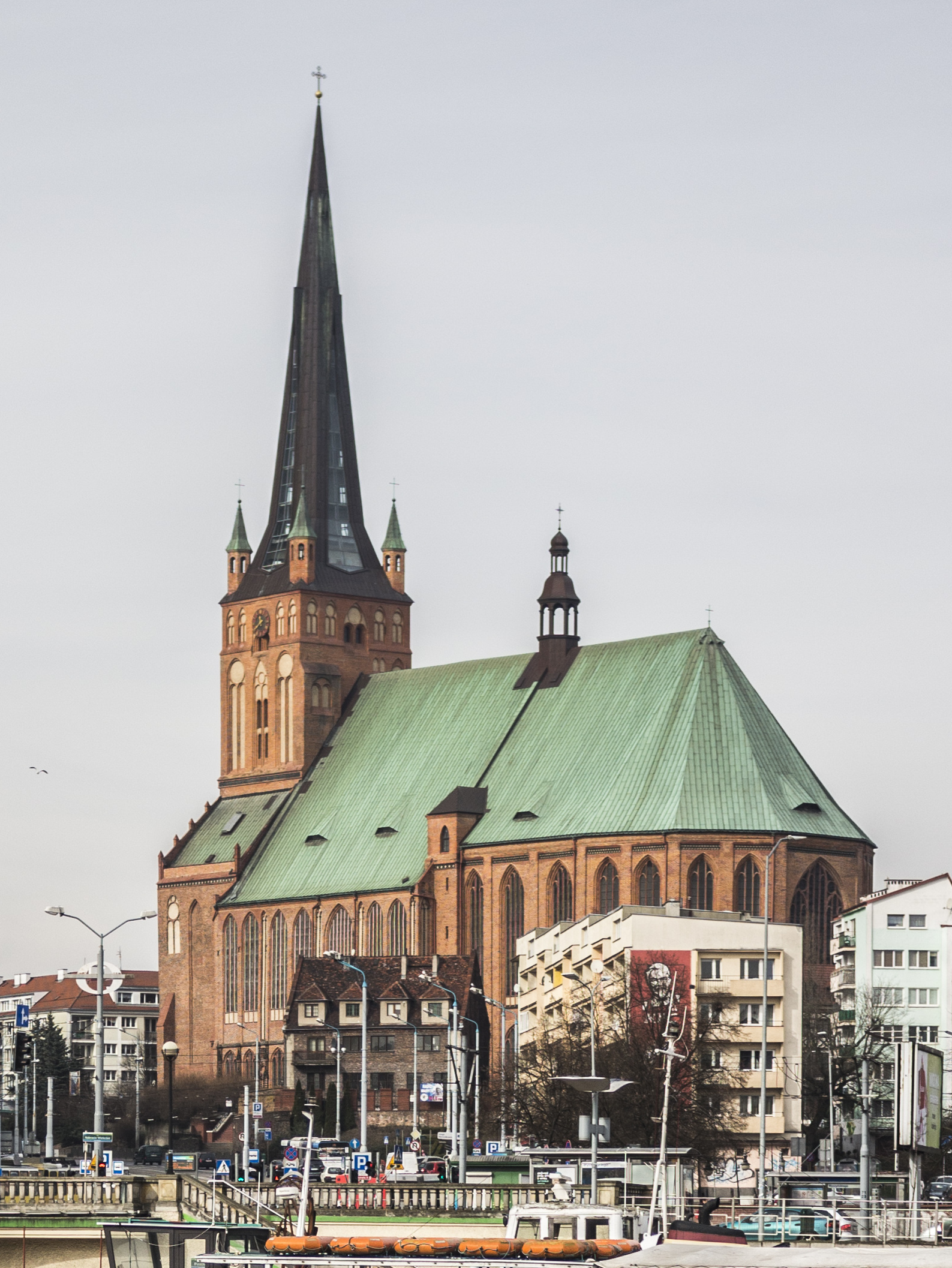
Szczecin Cathedral, first built in the 14th century

After the Battle of Verchen in 1164, Stettin duke Bogusław I, Duke of Pomerania became a vassal of the Duchy of Saxony's Henry the Lion. In 1173, Stettin castellan Wartislaw II, could not resist a Danish attack and became vassal of Denmark. In 1181, Bogusław became a vassal of the Holy Roman Empire. In 1185, Bogusław again became a Danish vassal. Despite falling under foreign suzerainty, local dukes maintained close ties with the fragmented Polish realm, and future Polish monarch Władysław III Spindleshanks stayed at the local court of Duke Bogusław I in 1186, on behalf of his father Mieszko III the Old, Duke of Greater Poland, who also periodically was the High Duke of Poland. Following a conflict between his heirs and Canute VI of Denmark, the settlement was destroyed in 1189, but the fortress was reconstructed and manned with a Danish force in 1190. While the empire restored its superiority over the Duchy of Pomerania in the Battle of Bornhöved in 1227, Stettin was one of two bridgeheads remaining under Danish control (until 1235; Wolgast until 1241/43 or 1250).

In the second half of the 12th century, a group of German tradesmen ("multus populus Teutonicorum" from various parts of the Holy Roman Empire) settled in the city around St. Jacob's Church, which was donated in 1180 by Beringer, a trader from Bamberg, and consecrated in 1187. Hohenkrug (now Zdunowo) was the first village in the Duchy of Pomerania that was clearly recorded as German (villa teutonicorum) in 1173. Ostsiedlung accelerated in Pomerania during the 13th century. Duke Barnim I of Pomerania granted Stettin a local government charter in 1237, separating the German settlement from the Slavic community settled around the St. Nicholas church in the neighbourhood of Kessin (Polish: Chyzin). In the charter, the Slavs were put under Germanic jurisdiction.

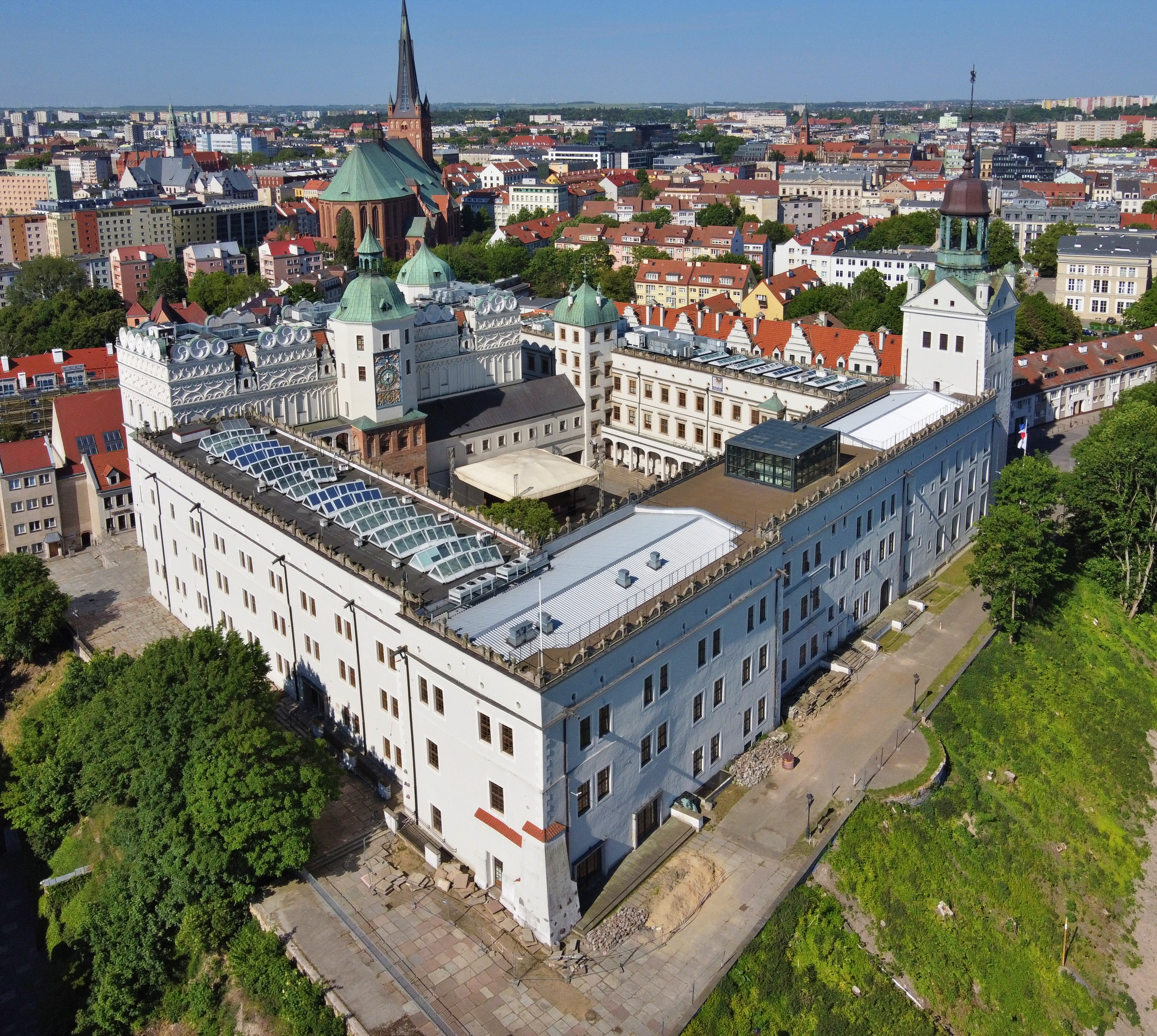
Szczecin Castle, the seat of the dukes of the House of Griffin, which was founded by Duke Wartislaw I

When Barnim granted Stettin Magdeburg rights in 1243, a part of the Slavic settlement was reconstructed. The duke had to promise to level the burgh in 1249. Most Slavic inhabitants were resettled to two new suburbs north and south of the town.

In 1249, Barnim I also granted equivalent Magdeburg town privileges to the town of Damm (also known as Altdamm, now the Dąbie neighbourhood) on the eastern bank of the Oder. Damm merged with neighbouring Stettin on 15 October 1939. This town had been built on the site of a former Pomeranian burg, "Vadam" or "Dambe", which Boleslaw had destroyed during his 1121 campaign.

On 2 December 1261, Barnim I allowed Jewish settlement in Stettin in accordance with the Magdeburg law, in a privilege renewed in 1308 and 1371. The Jewish Jordan family was granted citizenship in 1325, but none of the 22 Jews allowed to settle in the duchy in 1481 lived in the city, and in 1492, all Jews in the duchy were ordered to convert to Christianity or leave – this order remained effective throughout the rest of the Griffin era.

In 1273, duke of Poznań and future King of Poland Przemysł II married princess Ludgarda, granddaughter of Barnim I, Duke of Pomerania in the city, in order to strengthen the alliance between the two rulers.

Stettin was part of the federation of Wendish towns, a predecessor of the Hanseatic League, in 1283. The city prospered due to its participation in the Baltic Sea trade, primarily with herring, grain, and timber; craftsmanship also prospered, and more than forty guilds were established in the city. The far-reaching autonomy granted by the House of Griffins was in part reduced when the dukes reclaimed Stettin as their main residence in the late 15th century. The anti-Slavic policies of German merchants and craftsmen intensified in this period, resulting in measures such as bans on people of Slavic descent joining craft guilds, a doubling of customs tax for Slavic merchants, and bans against public usage of their native language. The more prosperous Slavic citizens were forcibly stripped of their possessions, which were then handed over to Germans. In 1514, the guild of tailors added a Wendenparagraph to its statutes, banning Slavs.

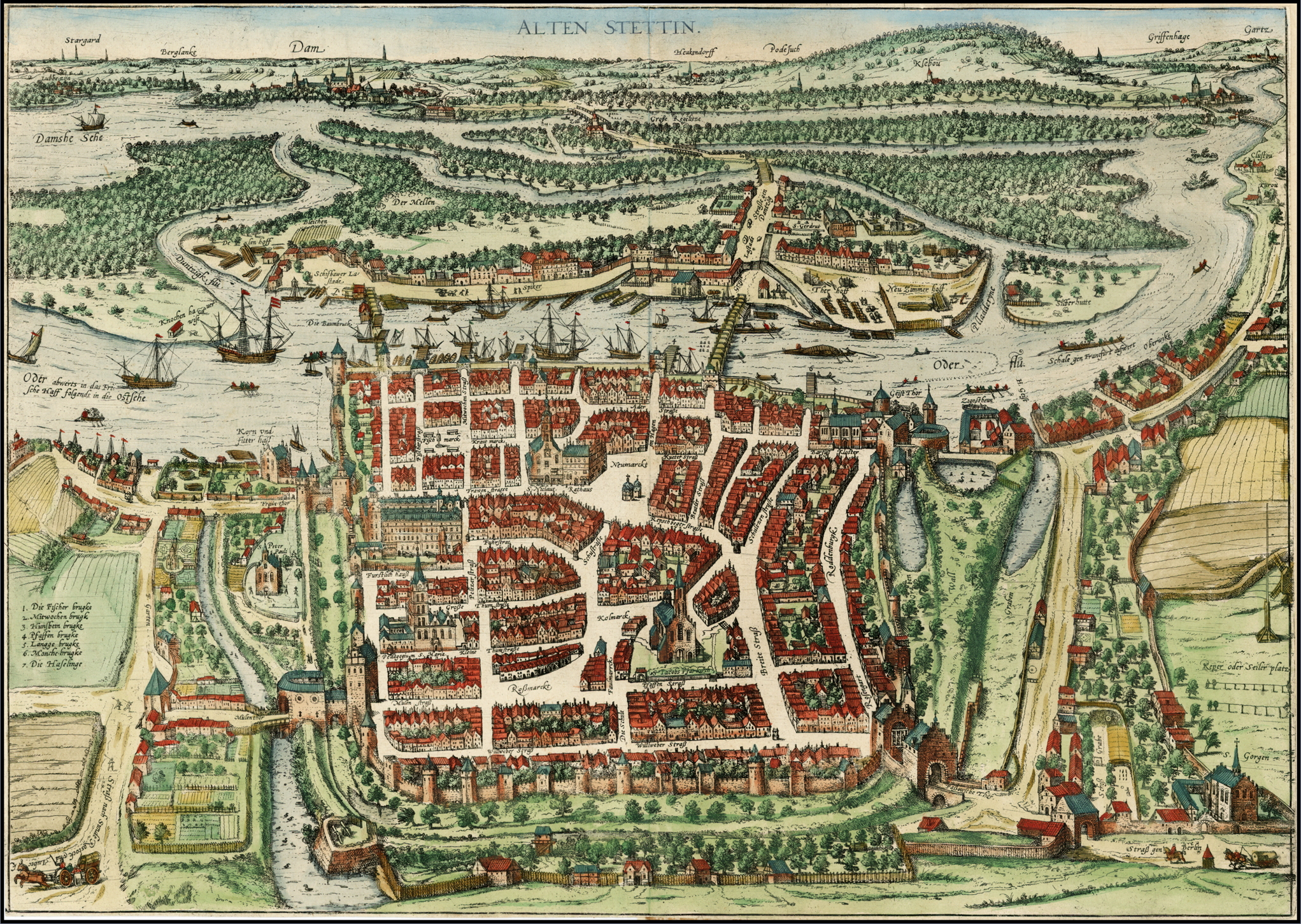
View of the city with fortifications, 1581

While not as heavily affected by medieval witchhunts as other regions of the Holy Roman Empire, there are reports of the burning of three women and one man convicted of witchcraft in 1538.

In 1570, during the reign of John Frederick, Duke of Pomerania, a congress was held at Stettin ending the Northern Seven Years' War. During the war, Stettin had tended to side with Denmark, while Stralsund tended toward Sweden – as a whole, however, the Duchy of Pomerania tried to maintain neutrality. Nevertheless, a Landtag that had met in Stettin in 1563 introduced a sixfold rise in real estate taxes to finance the raising of a mercenary army for the duchy's defence. Johann Friedrich also succeeded in elevating Stettin to one of only three places allowed to coin money in the Upper Saxon Circle of the Holy Roman Empire, the other two places being Leipzig and Berlin. Bogislaw XIV, who resided in Stettin beginning in 1620, became the sole ruler and Griffin duke when Philipp Julius, Duke of Pomerania died in 1625. Before the Thirty Years' War reached Pomerania, the city, as well as the entire duchy, declined economically due to the decrease in importance of the Hanseatic League and a conflict between Stettin and Frankfurt an der Oder.

=== 17th to 18th centuries ===
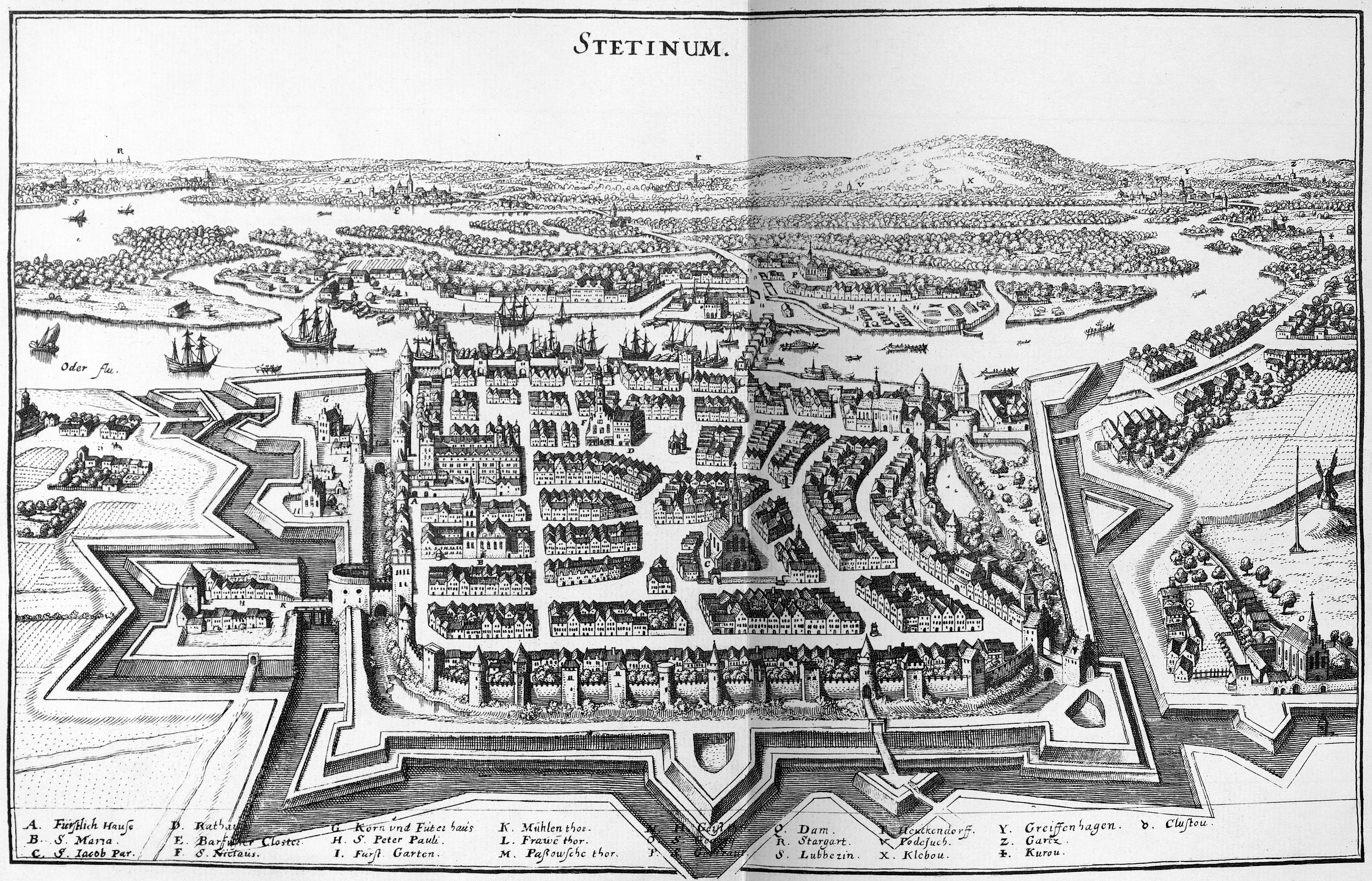
The city's fortifications, as seen in 1642

Following the Treaty of Stettin of 1630, the town (along with most of Pomerania) was allied to and occupied by the Swedish Empire, which managed to keep the western parts of Pomerania after the death of Bogislaw XIV in 1637. From the Peace of Westphalia in 1648, Stettin became the capital of Swedish Pomerania. Stettin was turned into a major Swedish fortress, which was repeatedly besieged in subsequent wars. In 1677, the city was successfully besieged by a Danish, Brandenburger, and Lüneburger army. Stettin remained under Swedish control after the Treaty of Saint-Germain-en-Laye (1679), but due to the downfall of the Swedish Empire after Charles XII, the city went to Prussia in 1720. Instead Stralsund became capital of the last remaining parts of Swedish Pomerania 1720–1815.

Wars inhibited the city's economic prosperity, which had undergone a deep crisis during the devastation of the Thirty Years' War and was further impeded by the new Swedish-Brandenburg-Prussian frontier, cutting Stettin off from its traditional Farther Pomeranian hinterland. Due to a Plague during the Great Northern War, the city's population dropped from 6,000 people in 1709 to 4,000 in 1711. In 1720, after the Great Northern War, Sweden was forced to cede the city to King Frederick William I of Prussia. Stettin was made the capital city of the Prussian Pomeranian province, since 1815 reorganised as the Province of Pomerania. In 1816, the city had 26,000 inhabitants.

The Prussian administration deprived the city of its right to administrative autonomy, abolished guild privileges as well as its status as a staple town, and subsidised manufacturers. Also, colonists were settled in the city, primarily French Huguenots. The French settlers, who numbered more than 600, established a prosperous community, greatly contributed to the city's economic revival, and were treated with reluctance by the German burghers and city authorities.

=== 19th to 20th centuries ===
In October 1806, during the War of the Fourth Coalition, believing that he was facing a much larger force, and after receiving a threat of harsh treatment of the city, the Prussian commander Lieutenant General Friedrich von Romberg agreed to surrender the city to the French led by General Lasalle. In fact, Lasalle had only 800 men against Romberg's 5,300 men. In March 1809 Romberg was convicted and sentenced to life imprisonment for giving up Stettin without a fight. In 1809, also Polish troops were stationed in the city, while the French remained until 1813.

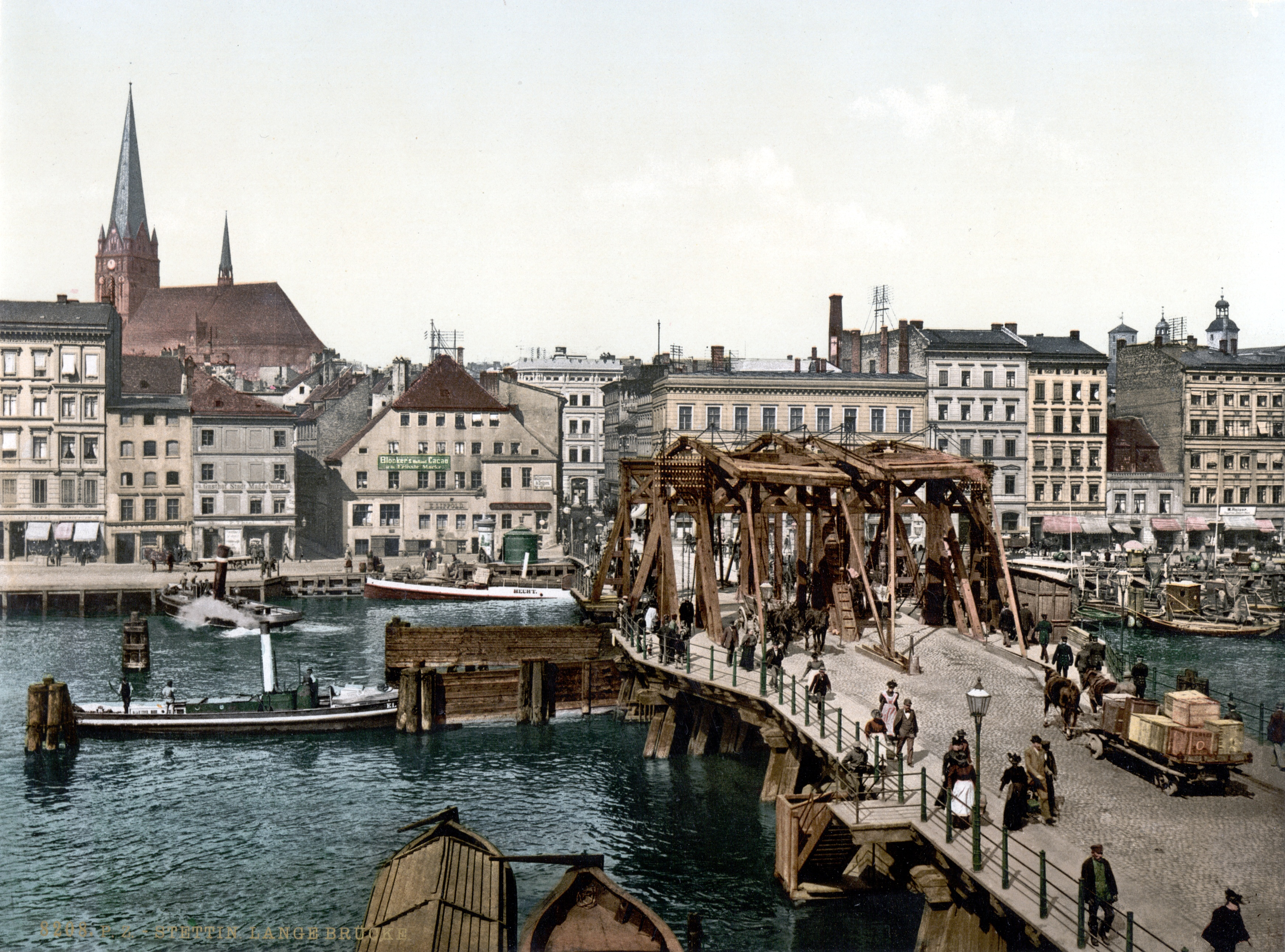
Late 19th-century view of the city's riverfront

From 1683 to 1812, one Jew was permitted to reside in Stettin, and an additional Jew was allowed to spend a night in the city in case of "urgent business". These permissions were repeatedly withdrawn between 1691 and 1716, also between 1726 and 1730 although else the Swedish regulation was continued by the Prussian administration. Only after the Prussian Edict of Emancipation of 11 March 1812, which granted Prussian citizenship to all Jews living in the kingdom, did a Jewish community emerge in Stettin, with the first Jews settling in the town in 1814. Construction of a synagogue started in 1834; the community also owned a religious and a secular school, an orphanage since 1855, and a retirement home since 1893. The Jewish community had between 1,000 and 1,200 members by 1873 and between 2,800 and 3,000 members by 1927–28. These numbers dropped to 2,701 in 1930 and to 2,322 in late 1934.

After the Franco Prussian war of 1870–1871, 1,700 French POWs were imprisoned there in deplorable conditions, resulting in the deaths of 600; After the war, Stettin remained a fortress until 1873. When part of the defensive structures were levelled, a new neighbourhood, Neustadt ("New Town") as well as water pipes, sewerage and drainage, and gas works were built to meet the demands of the growing population.

Stettin developed into a major Prussian port and following the unification of Germany in 1871 became part of the German Empire. While most of the province retained its agrarian character, Stettin was industrialised, and its population rose from 27,000 in 1813 to 210,000 in 1900 and 255,500 in 1925. Major industries that flourished in Stettin from 1840 were shipbuilding, chemical and food industries, and machinery construction. Starting in 1843, Stettin became connected to the major German and Pomeranian cities by railways, and the water connection to the Bay of Pomerania was enhanced by the construction of the Kaiserfahrt (now Piast) canal. The city was also a scientific centre; for example, it was home to the Entomological Society of Stettin.

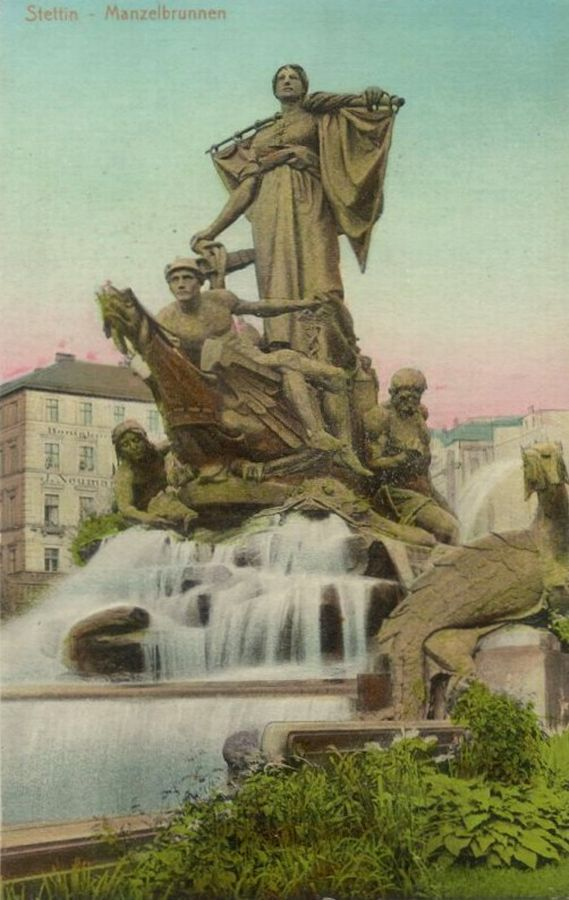
Sedina Monument from 1898 sculptured by Ludwig Manzel (postcard from c.1899-1913) – Sedina was a personification of the city, symbolising maritime trade and commerce.

On 20 October 1890, some of the city's Poles created the "Society of Polish-Catholic Workers" in the city, one of the first Polish organisations. In 1897, the city's ship works began the construction of the pre-dreadnought battleship Kaiser Wilhelm der Grosse. In 1914, before World War I, the Polish community in the city numbered over 3,000 people, contributing about 2% of the population. These were primarily industrial workers and their families who came from the Poznań (Posen) area and a few local wealthy industrialists and merchants. Among them was Kazimierz Pruszak, director of the Gollnow industrial works and a Polish patriot, who predicted the eventual "return" of Szczecin to Poland.

During the First World War, Stettin's port remained an important entry point for raw materials, particularly from Sweden, despite the Allied naval blockade of Germany. During the German Revolution, a workers' and soldiers' council was formed in the city in November 1918.

The territorial changes resulting from the Treaty of Versailles separated Stettin from parts of its economic hinterland and disrupted traditional trading networks. Despite these difficulties, the port underwent substantial modernisation during the 1920s. Stettin was Weimar Germany's largest port on the Baltic Sea, and her third-largest port after Hamburg and Bremen. The city's shipbuilding industry declined, culminating in the closure of the Vulcan shipyard in 1928. The Great Depression further aggravated the city's economic difficulties, with unemployment exceeding 45,000 by 1930. Cars of the Stoewer automobile company were produced in Stettin from 1899 to 1945. By 1939, the Reichsautobahn Berlin–Stettin was completed.

In the March 1933 German elections to the Reichstag, the Nazis and German nationalists from the German National People's Party (or DNVP) won most of the votes in the city, together winning 98,626 of 165,331 votes (59.3%), with the NSDAP getting 79,729 (47.9%) and the DNVP 18,897 (11.4%).

In 1935, the Wehrmacht made Stettin the headquarters for Wehrkreis II, which controlled the military units in all of Mecklenburg and Pomerania. It was also the area headquarters for units stationed at Stettin I and II, Swinemünde (Świnoujście), Greifswald, and Stralsund.

In the interwar period, the Polish minority numbered 2,000 people, less than 1% of the city's population at that time. A number of Poles were members of the Union of Poles in Germany (ZPN), which was active in the city from 1924. A Polish consulate was located in the city between 1925 and 1939. On the initiative of the consulate and ZPN activist Maksymilian Golisz, a number of Polish institutions were established, e.g., a Polish Scout team and a Polish school. German historian Musekamp writes, "however, only very few Poles were active in these institutions, which for the most part were headed by employees of the [Polish] consulate." The withdrawal of the consulate from these institutions led to a general decline of these activities, which were in part upheld by Golisz and Aleksander Omieczyński. Intensified repressions by the Nazis, who exaggerated the Polish activities to propagate an infiltration, led to the closing of the school. In 1938, the head of Szczecin's Union of Poles unit, Stanisław Borkowski, was imprisoned in Sachsenhausen concentration camp in Oranienburg. In 1939, all Polish organisations in Stettin were disbanded by the German authorities. Golisz and Omieczyński were murdered during the war. After the defeat of Nazi Germany, a street was named after Golisz. According to German historian Jan Musekamp, the activities of the Polish pre-war organizations were exaggerated after World War II for propaganda purposes.

==== World War II ====
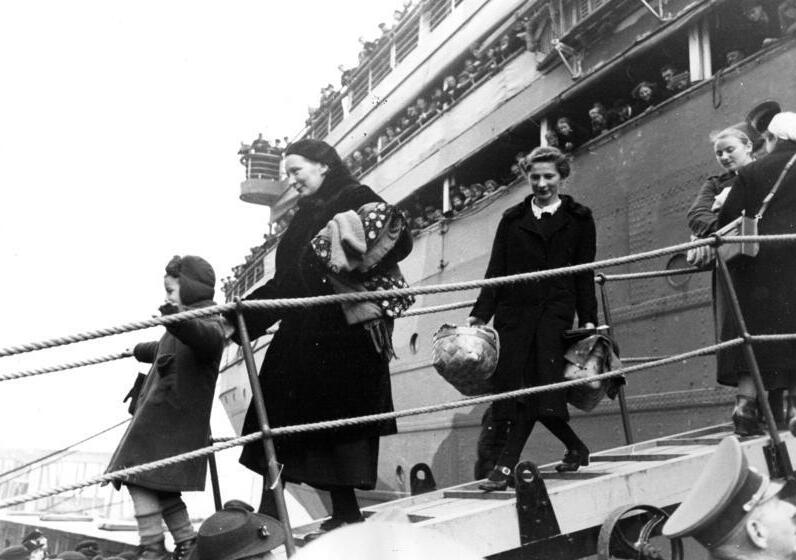
Baltic German resettlers disembarking at the port of Stettin in 1939

During World War II, Stettin was the base for the German 2nd Motorised Infantry Division, which cut across the so-called Polish Corridor and was later used in 1940 as an embarkation point for Operation Weserübung, Germany's assault on Denmark and Norway.

On 15 October 1939, neighbouring municipalities were joined to Stettin, creating Groß-Stettin, with about 380,000 inhabitants, in 1940. The city had become the third-largest German city by area, after Berlin and Hamburg.

Stettin served as a key arrival port in the Nazi-organised resettlement of Baltic Germans under the Heim ins Reich program, where ethnic German evacuees were ceremonially received as part of the regime's propagandised "homecoming" to the Reich.

As the war started, the number of non-Germans in the city increased as slave workers were brought in. The first transports came in 1939 from Bydgoszcz, Toruń and Łódź. They were mainly used in a synthetic silk factory near Stettin. The next wave of slave workers was brought in 1940, in addition to PoWs who were used for work in the agricultural industry. According to German police reports from 1940, 15,000 Polish slave workers lived within the city.

During the war, 135 forced labour camps for slave workers were established in the city. Most of the 25,000 slave workers were Poles, but Czechs, Italians, Frenchmen and Belgians, as well as Dutch citizens, were also enslaved in the camps. A Nazi prison was also operated in the city, with forced labour subcamps in the region.

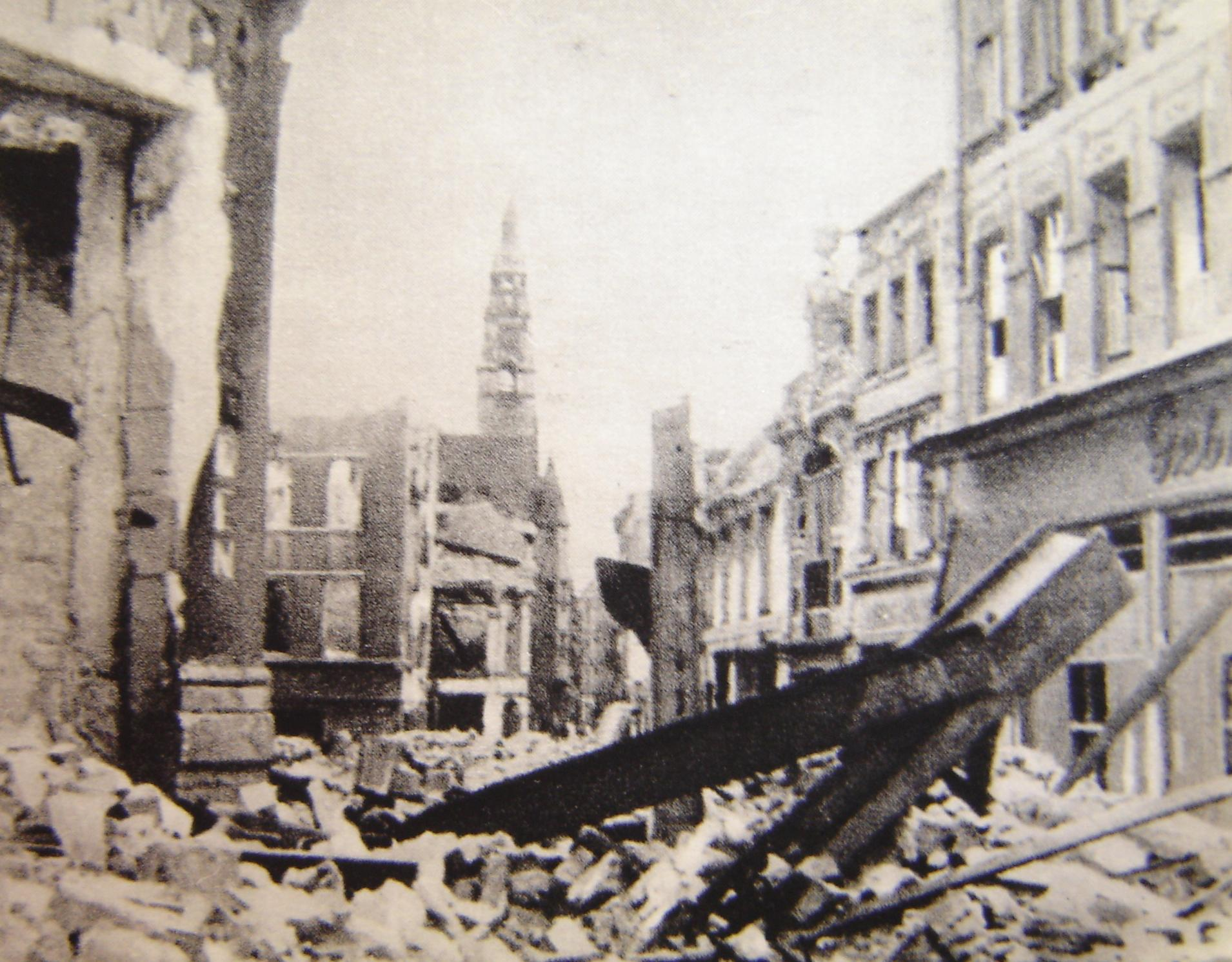
The city centre in 1945

In February 1940, the Jews of Stettin were deported to the Lublin reservation. International press reports emerged, describing how the Nazis forced Jews, regardless of age, condition and gender, to sign away all property and loaded them onto trains headed to the camp, escorted by members of the SA and SS. Due to publicity given to the event, German institutions ordered such future actions to be made in a way unlikely to attract public notice. The action was the first deportation of Jews from prewar territory in Nazi Germany.

Allied air raids in 1944 and heavy fighting between the German and Soviet armies destroyed 65% of Stettin's buildings and almost all of the city centre, the seaport, and local industries. Polish Home Army intelligence assisted in pinpointing targets for Allied bombing in the area of Stettin. The city itself was covered by the Home Army's "Bałtyk" structure, and Polish resistance infiltrated Stettin's naval yards. Other activities of the resistance consisted of smuggling people, including Polish and British POWs who escaped from German captivity, to Sweden, and distribution of Polish underground press.

The Soviet Red Army captured the city on 26 April 1945. While the majority of the almost 400,000 inhabitants had left the city, between 6,000 and 20,000 inhabitants remained in late April.

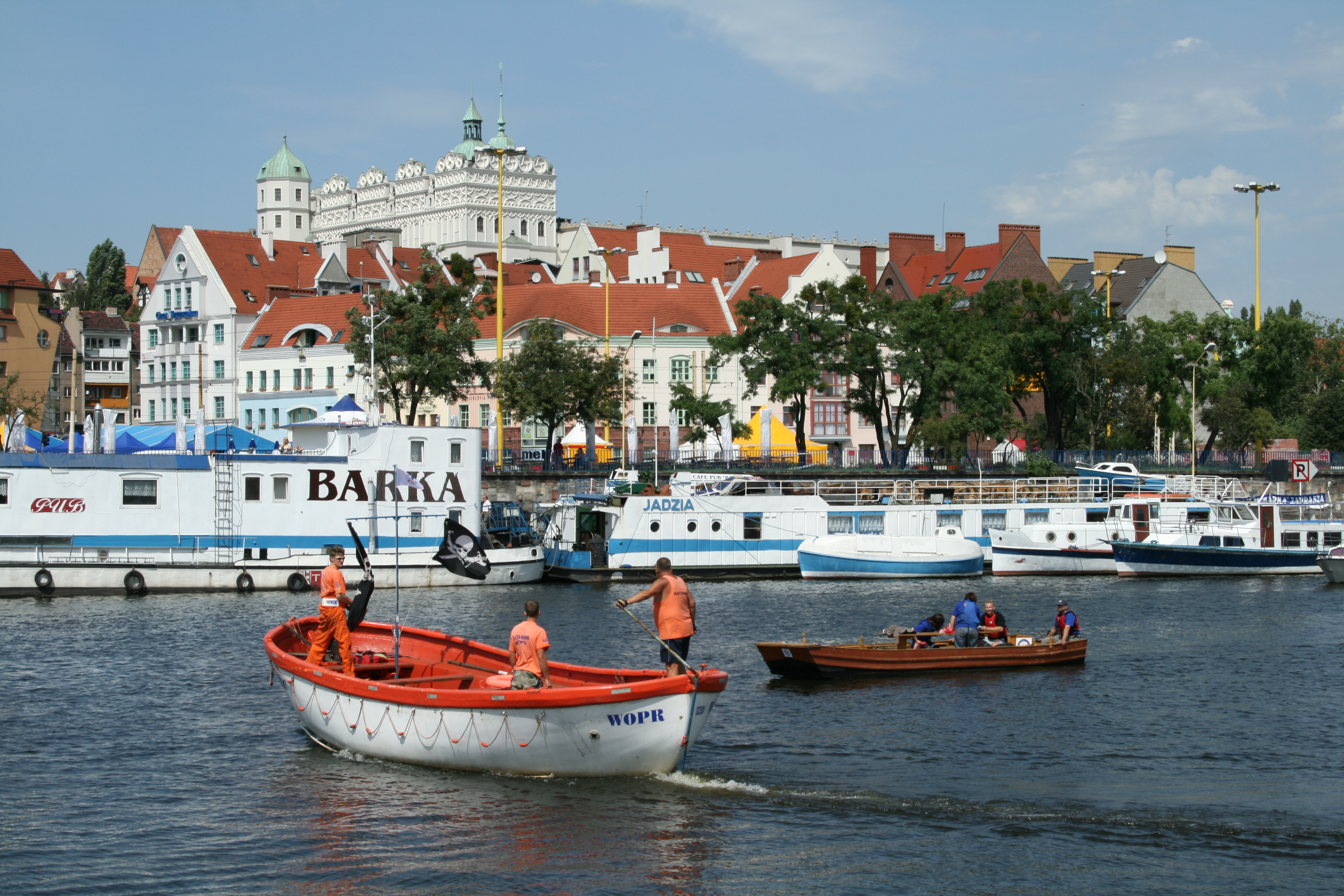
View of the Old Town from the Oder River. Most of the medieval buildings in the city centre were completely destroyed during World War II. The Ducal Castle can be seen in the background.

On 28 April 1945 Polish authorities tried to gain control, but in the following month, the Polish administration was twice forced to leave. The reason for this was, according to Polish sources, that the Western Allies raised protest against the Soviet and Polish policy of creating a fait-accompli in Eastern Germany. Finally the permanent handover occurred on 5 July 1945. In the meantime, part of the German population had returned, believing it might become part of the Soviet occupation zone of Germany. The Soviet authorities had already appointed the German Communists Erich Spiegel and Erich Wiesner as mayors. Stettin is located mostly west of the Oder River, which was expected to become Poland's new western border, placing Stettin in East Germany. This would have been in accordance with the Potsdam Agreement between the victorious Allied powers, which envisaged the new border to be in "a line running from the Baltic Sea immediately west of Swinemünde, and thence along the Oder River[...]". Because of the returnees, the German population of the town swelled to 84,000. The mortality rate was at 20%, primarily due to starvation. However, Stettin and the mouth of the Oder River became Polish on 5 July 1945, as had been decided in a treaty signed on 26 July 1944 between the Soviet Union and the Soviet-controlled Polish Committee of National Liberation (PKWN) (also known as "the Lublin Poles", as contrasted with the London-based Polish government-in-exile). On 4 October 1945, the decisive land border of Poland was established west of the 1945 line, and the city was renamed to its Polish name Szczecin, but the area excluded the Police area, the Oder River itself and the port of Szczecin, which remained under Soviet administration. The Oder River was handed over to Polish administration in September 1946, followed by the port between February 1946 and May 1954.

==== Post-war ====
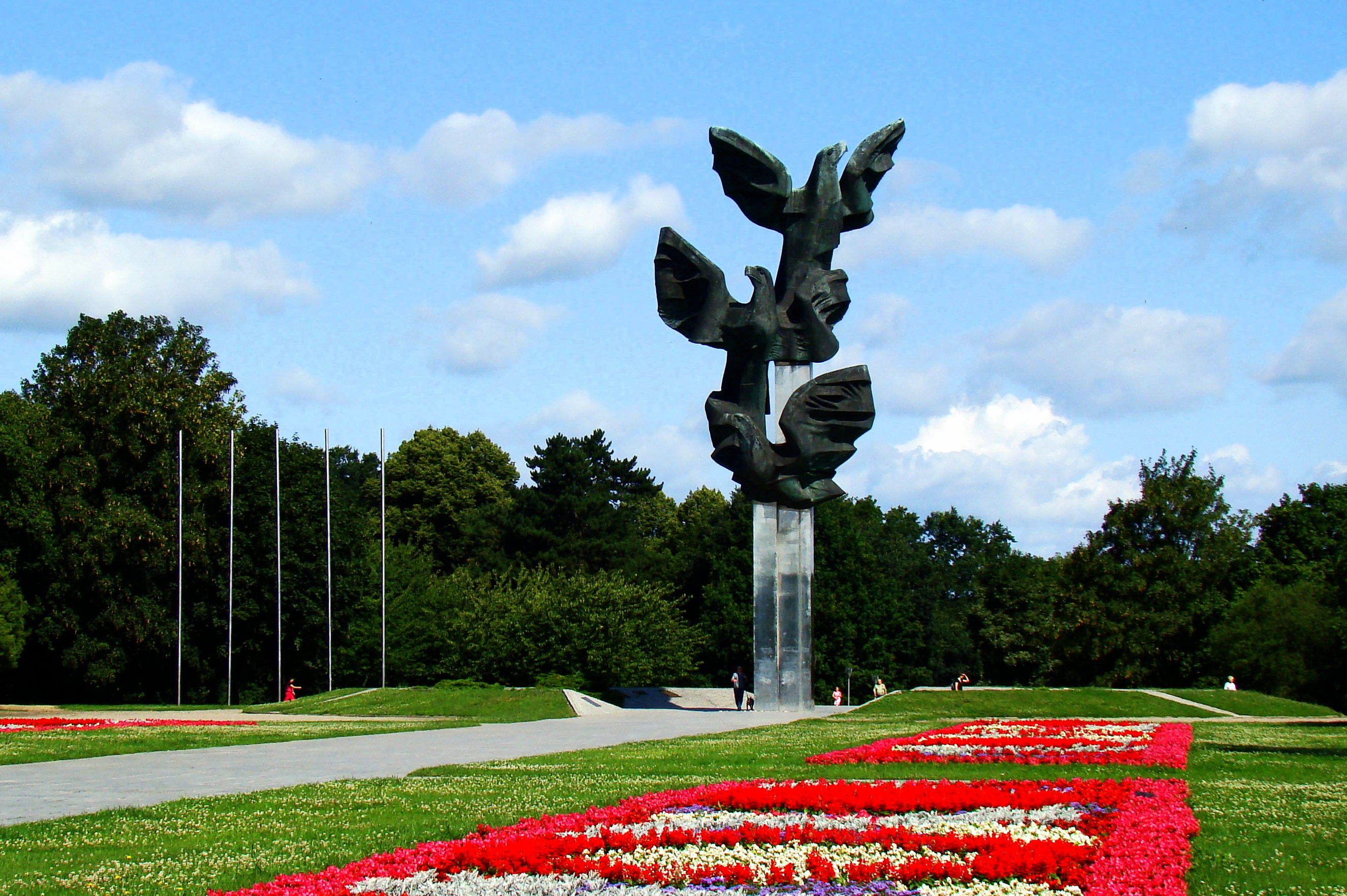
The Monument to the Polish Endeavor, dedicated to three generations of Poles in Western Pomerania: the pre-war Poles in Szczecin, the Poles who rebuilt the city after World War II, and the modern generation

While the number of pre-war inhabitants dropped to 57,215 on 31 October 1945, the systematic expulsion of Germans started on 22 February 1946 and continued until late 1947. In December 1946 about 17,000 German inhabitants remained, while the number of Poles living in the city reached 100,000. To ease the tensions between settlers from different regions, and help overcome fear caused by the continued presence of the Soviet troops, a special event was organised in April 1946 with 50,000 visitors in the partly destroyed city centre. Settlers from Central Poland made up about 70% of Szczecin's new population. In addition to Poles, Ukrainians from Polish areas annexed by the Soviet Union settled there. Also Poles repatriated from Harbin, China and Greeks, refugees of the Greek Civil War, settled in Szczecin in the following years. In 1945 and 1946, the city was the starting point of the northern route used by the Jewish underground organisation Brichah to channel Jewish displaced persons from Central and Eastern Europe to the American occupation zone. By 1950, the entire German population of the city had been expelled.

Szczecin was rebuilt, and the city's industry was expanded. At the same time, Szczecin became a major Polish industrial centre and an important seaport (particularly for Silesian coal) for Poland, Czechoslovakia and East Germany. Cultural expansion was accompanied by a campaign resulting in the "removal of all German traces". In 1946, Winston Churchill prominently mentioned the city in his Iron Curtain speech: "From Stettin in the Baltic to Trieste in the Adriatic an iron curtain has descended across the Continent".

Szczecin Shipyard workers' strike against the communist government authorities in Poland, August 1980

The city witnessed anti-communist revolts in 1956, 1970 and 1980. On 30 August 1980, first of the four August Agreements, which led to the first legalisation of the trade union Solidarity, was signed in Szczecin. The introduction of martial law in December 1981 met with a strike by the dockworkers of Szczecin shipyard, joined by other factories and workplaces in a general strike. All these were suppressed by the communist authorities. Pope John Paul II visited the city on 11 June 1987. Another wave of strikes in Szczecin broke out in 1988 and 1989, which eventually led to the Round Table Agreement and first semi-free elections in post-war Poland.

Szczecin has been the capital of the West Pomeranian Voivodeship since 1999.

== Geography ==
=== Climate ===
Szczecin

Climate chart (precipitation, max. and min. temperature)
J	F	M	A	M	J	J	A	S	O	N	D
39 3 −3	34 4 −2	41 8 0	35 14 4	52 19 8	62 21 11	67 24 14	60 24 13	44 19 10	39 13 6	43 7 2	43 3 −1
- █ Average max. and min. temperatures in °C
- █ Precipitation totals in mm
- Source: World Meteorological Organisation
Imperial conversion
J	F	M	A	M	J	J	A	S	O	N	D
1.5 37 28	1.3 39 29	1.6 47 33	1.4 57 39	2.1 66 47	2.4 71 52	2.6 75 56	2.3 74 56	1.7 66 49	1.5 56 42	1.7 45 36	1.7 38 30
- █ Average max. and min. temperatures in °F
- █ Precipitation totals in inches

Szczecin has an oceanic climate (Köppen: Cfb), typical of Western Pomerania. The winters are colder than on the immediate coast and the summers are warm, but still with some moderation, especially due to the Baltic Sea.

The average air temperature in Szczecin ranges from 8 to 8.4 °C. The hottest month is July with a temperature of 15.8 °C to 20.3 °C, the coldest January from -1.1 °C to 2.6 °C. Air temperature below 0 °C occurs on average over 86 days a year, most frequently in January and February. The average annual rainfall is 537 mm, the average rainfall in the cool half-year is 225 mm, and in the warmer half-year is 350 mm. On average, 167 days with precipitation occurs.

Climate data for Szczecin (Szczecin Dąbie), elevation: 1 m, 1991-2020 normals, extremes 1951–present
Month	Jan	Feb	Mar	Apr	May	Jun	Jul	Aug	Sep	Oct	Nov	Dec	Year
Record high °C (°F)	15.5 (59.9)	17.9 (64.2)	23.9 (75.0)	30.6 (87.1)	32.0 (89.6)	35.6 (96.1)	37.3 (99.1)	37.8 (100.0)	30.8 (87.4)	26.7 (80.1)	19.4 (66.9)	14.9 (58.8)	37.8 (100.0)
Mean maximum °C (°F)	9.8 (49.6)	11.6 (52.9)	17.2 (63.0)	23.8 (74.8)	27.5 (81.5)	30.3 (86.5)	31.6 (88.9)	31.8 (89.2)	25.7 (78.3)	20.5 (68.9)	14.2 (57.6)	10.8 (51.4)	33.7 (92.7)
Mean daily maximum °C (°F)	3.0 (37.4)	4.5 (40.1)	8.5 (47.3)	14.7 (58.5)	19.1 (66.4)	22.1 (71.8)	24.3 (75.7)	24.0 (75.2)	19.2 (66.6)	13.5 (56.3)	7.5 (45.5)	4.0 (39.2)	13.7 (56.7)
Daily mean °C (°F)	0.6 (33.1)	1.5 (34.7)	4.2 (39.6)	9.2 (48.6)	13.6 (56.5)	16.8 (62.2)	18.9 (66.0)	18.5 (65.3)	14.3 (57.7)	9.5 (49.1)	4.9 (40.8)	1.9 (35.4)	9.5 (49.1)
Mean daily minimum °C (°F)	−1.8 (28.8)	−1.3 (29.7)	0.4 (32.7)	4.0 (39.2)	8.2 (46.8)	11.5 (52.7)	13.8 (56.8)	13.5 (56.3)	9.9 (49.8)	6.0 (42.8)	2.4 (36.3)	−0.5 (31.1)	5.5 (41.9)
Mean minimum °C (°F)	−11.8 (10.8)	−9.9 (14.2)	−7.3 (18.9)	−3.2 (26.2)	1.1 (34.0)	5.7 (42.3)	8.2 (46.8)	7.2 (45.0)	3.0 (37.4)	−2.1 (28.2)	−4.8 (23.4)	−8.6 (16.5)	−15.0 (5.0)
Record low °C (°F)	−30.0 (−22.0)	−28.7 (−19.7)	−23.1 (−9.6)	−7.7 (18.1)	−4.4 (24.1)	0.3 (32.5)	4.4 (39.9)	1.2 (34.2)	−2.6 (27.3)	−6.9 (19.6)	−11.4 (11.5)	−22.3 (−8.1)	−30.0 (−22.0)
Average precipitation mm (inches)	40.0 (1.57)	32.8 (1.29)	38.4 (1.51)	31.2 (1.23)	55.8 (2.20)	59.1 (2.33)	76.2 (3.00)	60.3 (2.37)	47.7 (1.88)	43.5 (1.71)	39.0 (1.54)	43.0 (1.69)	567.1 (22.33)
Average extreme snow depth cm (inches)	3.6 (1.4)	4.0 (1.6)	1.9 (0.7)	0.4 (0.2)	0.0 (0.0)	0.0 (0.0)	0.0 (0.0)	0.0 (0.0)	0.0 (0.0)	0.0 (0.0)	0.7 (0.3)	2.3 (0.9)	4.0 (1.6)
Average precipitation days (≥ 0.1 mm)	16.13	14.54	13.53	11.07	13.57	13.07	14.17	13.10	11.93	14.07	14.60	16.87	166.64
Average snowy days (≥ 0 cm)	7.6	6.9	2.8	0.4	0.0	0.0	0.0	0.0	0.0	0.0	1.3	4.7	23.7
Average relative humidity (%)	87.1	83.3	78.2	70.8	71.5	72.9	74.4	75.9	81.2	85.5	89.1	89.0	79.9
Average dew point °C (°F)	−1 (30)	−1 (30)	0 (32)	3 (37)	8 (46)	11 (52)	13 (55)	13 (55)	10 (50)	7 (45)	3 (37)	0 (32)	6 (42)
Mean monthly sunshine hours	42.7	66.7	121.2	199.3	244.5	242.3	246.3	230.3	160.0	105.7	47.4	32.2	1,738.6
Average ultraviolet index	0	1	2	4	5	6	6	5	4	2	1	0	3
Source 1: Institute of Meteorology and Water Management
Source 2: Meteomodel.pl (records, relative humidity 1991–2020), Weather Atlas (UV), Time and Date (dewpoints, 1985-2015)

See or edit raw graph data.

=== Architecture and urban planning ===
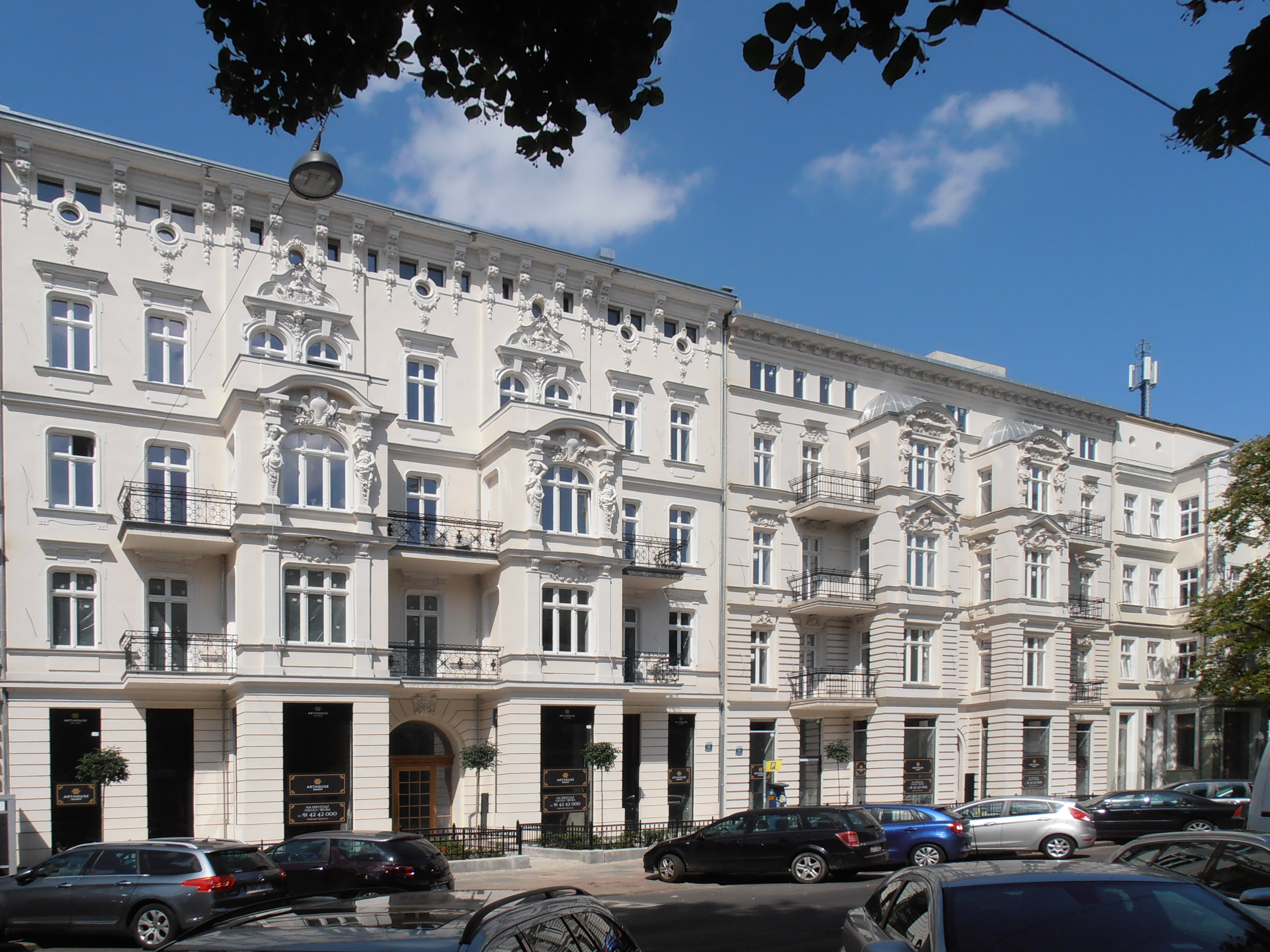
Historicist-style tenements on Śląska Street

Szczecin's architectural style reflects trends popular in the last half of the 19th century and the first years of the 20th century: Academic art (historicist Gründerzeit) and Art Nouveau. In many areas built after 1945, especially in the city centre, which had been partly destroyed due to Allied bombing, social realism is prevalent.

The city has an abundance of green areas: parks and avenues – wide streets with trees planted in the island separating opposing traffic (where often tram tracks are laid); and roundabouts corresponding to the Orion constellation. Szczecin's city plan resembles that of Paris, mostly because Szczecin was remodelled in the 1880s according to a design by Georges-Eugène Haussmann, who had redesigned Paris under Napoléon III. This pattern of street design is still used in Szczecin, as many recently built (or modified) city areas include roundabouts and avenues.

During the city's reconstruction in the aftermath of World War II, the communist authorities of Poland wanted the city's architecture to reflect an old Polish Piast era. Since no buildings from that time existed, instead Gothic as well as Renaissance buildings were picked as worthy of conservation. The motivation behind this decision was that Renaissance architecture was used by the Griffin dynasty, which had Lechitic and West Slavic roots and was seen to be of Piast extraction by some historians. This view was manifested, for example, by erecting respective memorials, and the naming of streets and enterprises, while German traces were replaced by symbols of three main categories: Piasts, the martyrdom of Poles, and gratitude to the Soviet and Polish armies which had ended the Nazi atrocities against Polish citizens.

The ruins of the former Griffin residence, initially renamed "Piast Palace", also played a central role in this concept and were reconstructed in Renaissance style, with all traces of later eras removed. In general, post-Renaissance buildings, especially those from the 19th and early 20th centuries, were deemed unworthy of conservation until the 1970s, and were in part used in the "Bricks for Warsaw" campaign (an effort to rebuild Warsaw after it had been systematically razed following the Warsaw Uprising): with 38 million bricks, Szczecin became Poland's largest brick supplier. The Old Town was rebuilt in the late 1990s, with new buildings, some of which were reconstructions of buildings destroyed in World War II.

The Gothic monuments preserved to this day are parts of the European Route of Brick Gothic, along with monuments of other Pomeranian cities, e.g. Stargard, Kamień Pomorski, Sławno and Chełmno.

A portion of the Szczecin Landscape Park in the forest of Puszcza Bukowa lies within Szczecin's boundaries.

Szczecin contains 28 extant historic water pumps, known as Szczecin pumps or Berliners, which are a popular tourist attraction due to their colorful and intricate design. Fresh water for the city is supplied from nearby Lake Miedwie.

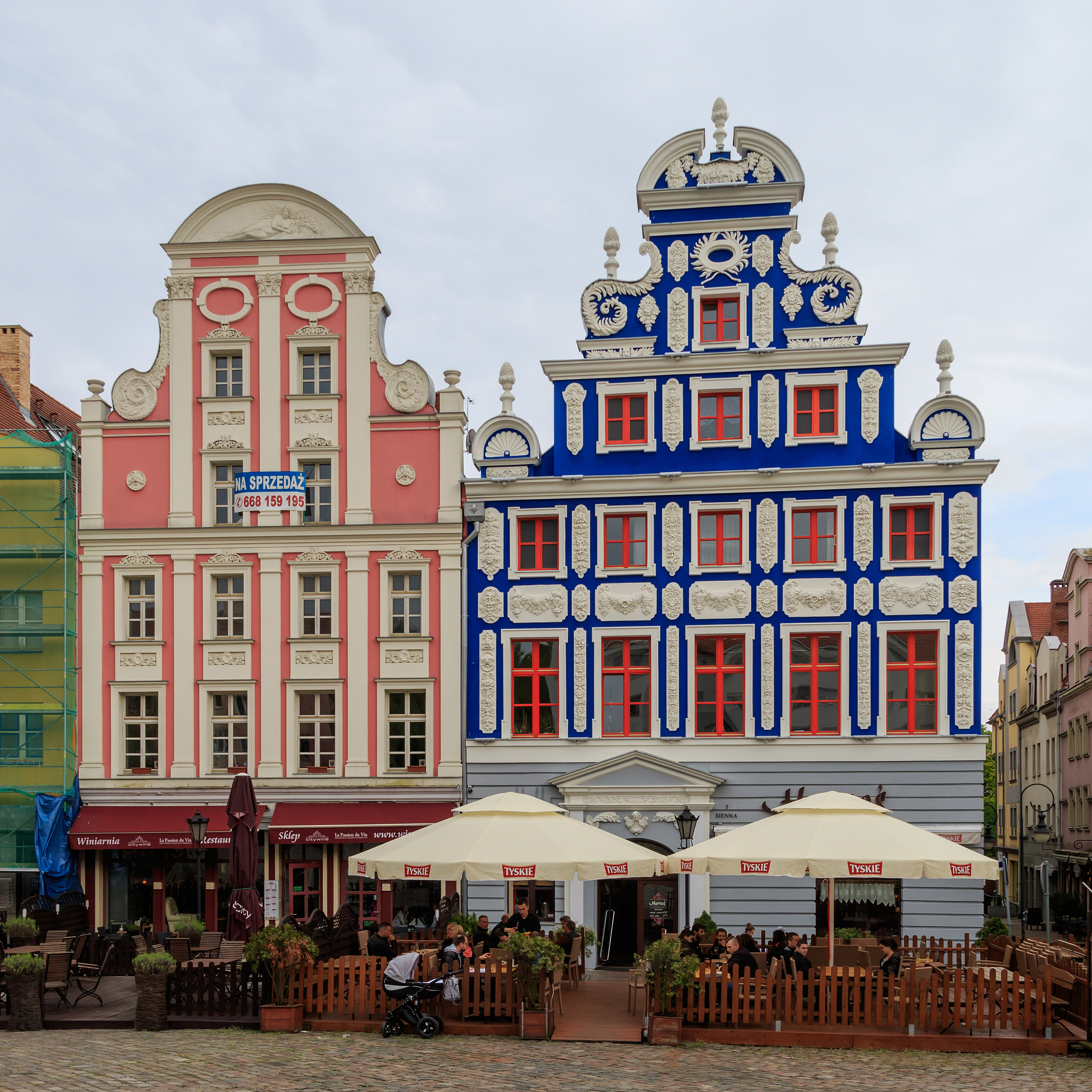
Façades in the rebuilt old town

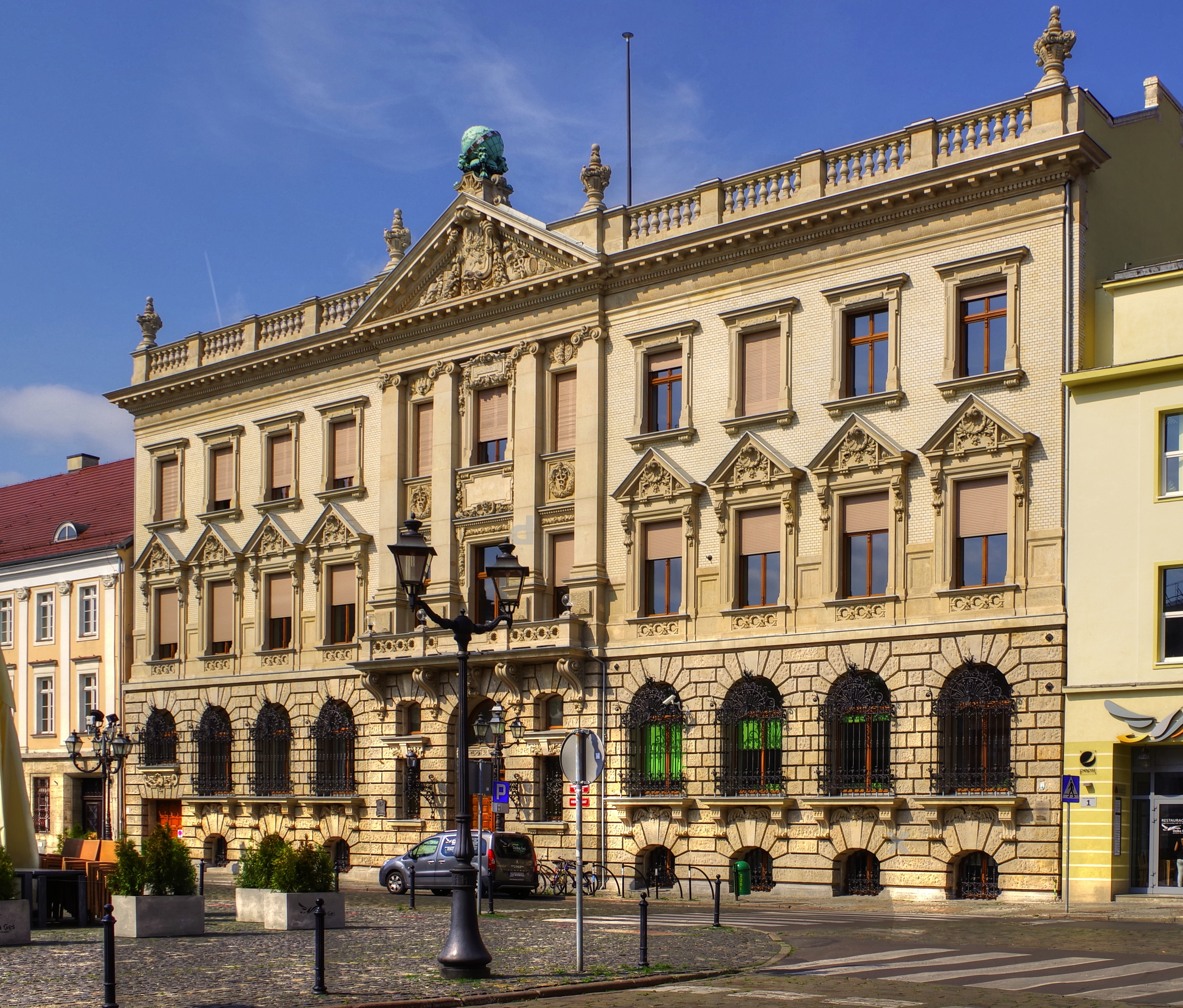
Globe Palace

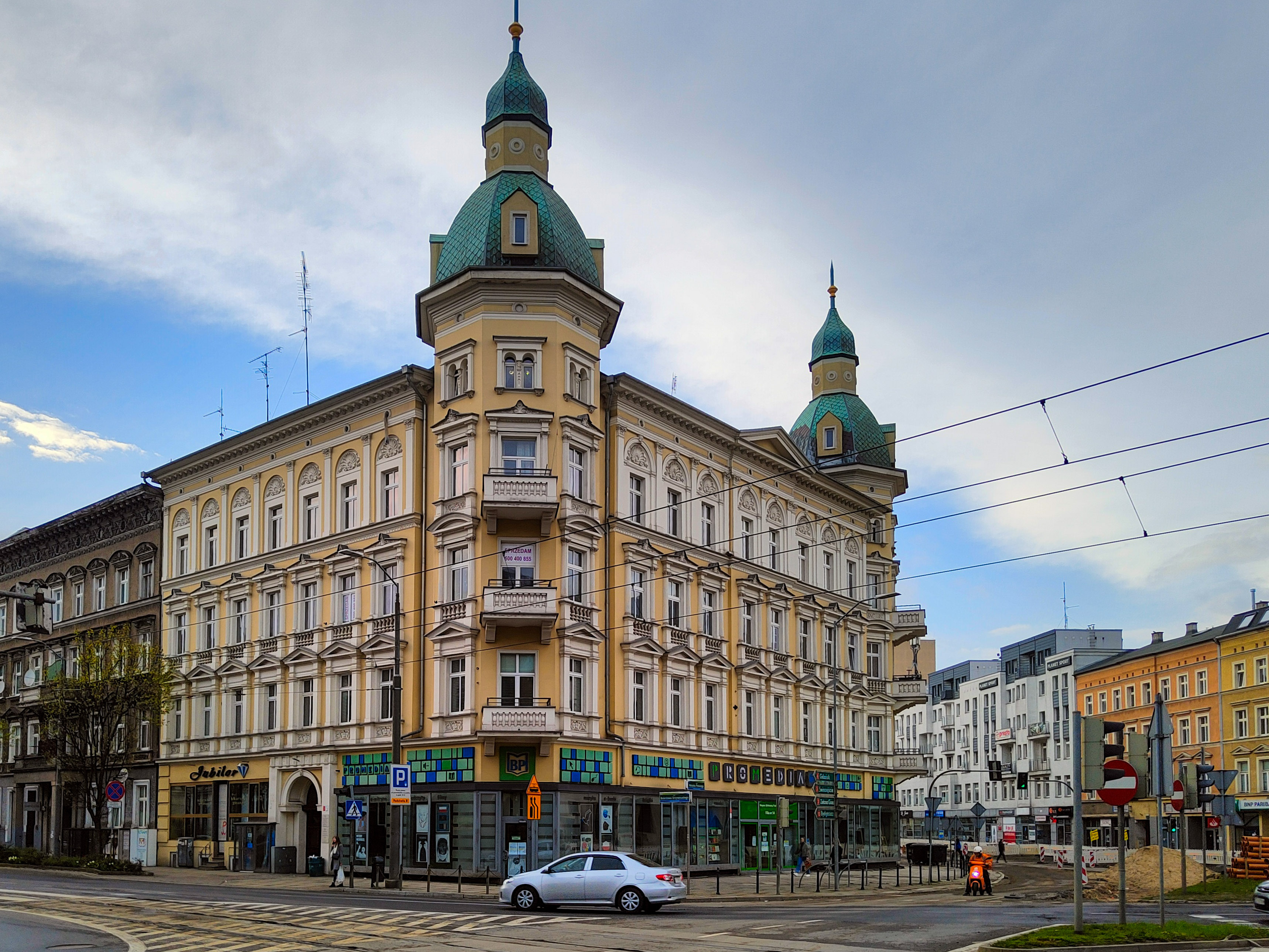
Tenement house at Vicory Square

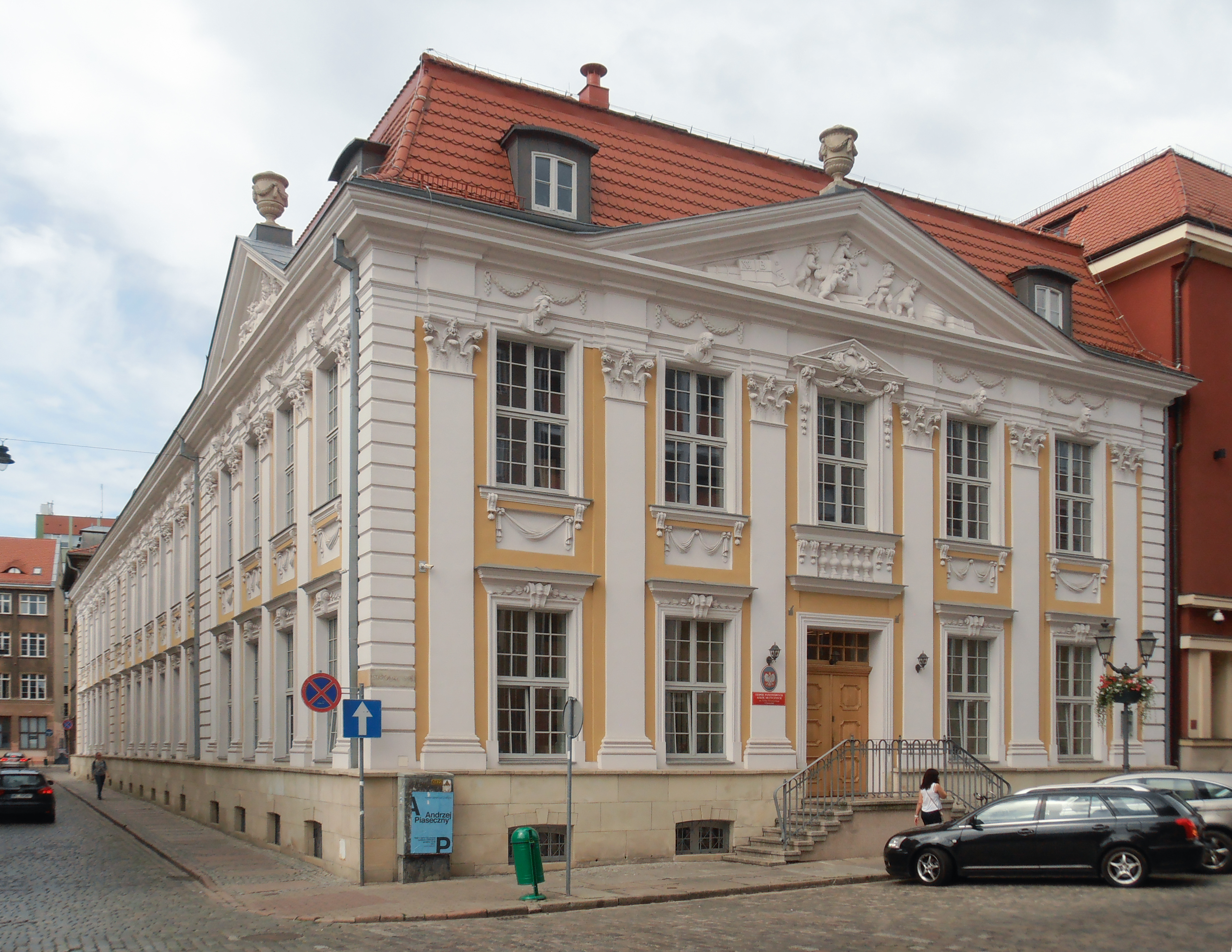
Velthusen Palace

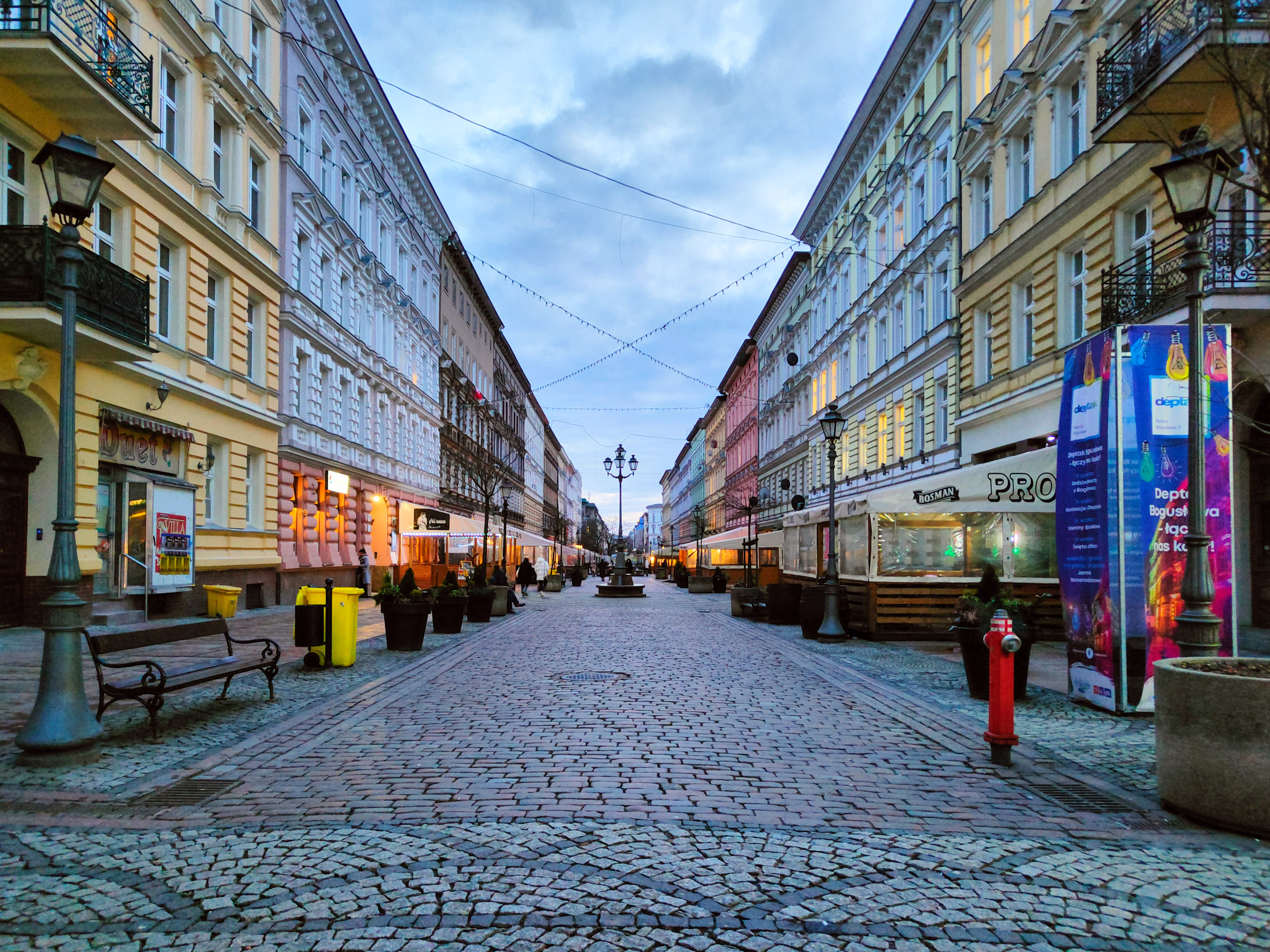
Bogusław X Street

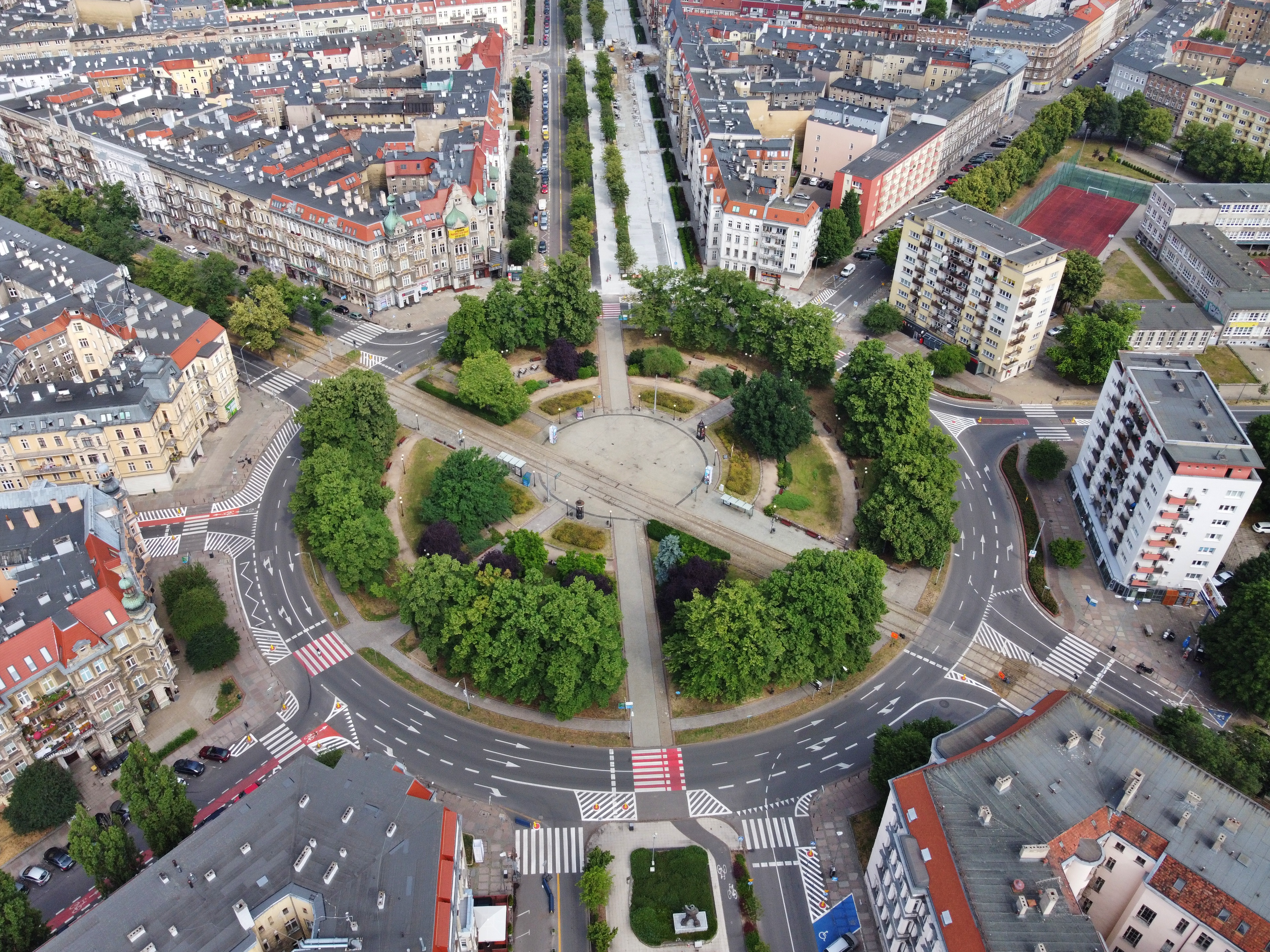
Grunwald Square

=== Municipal administration ===
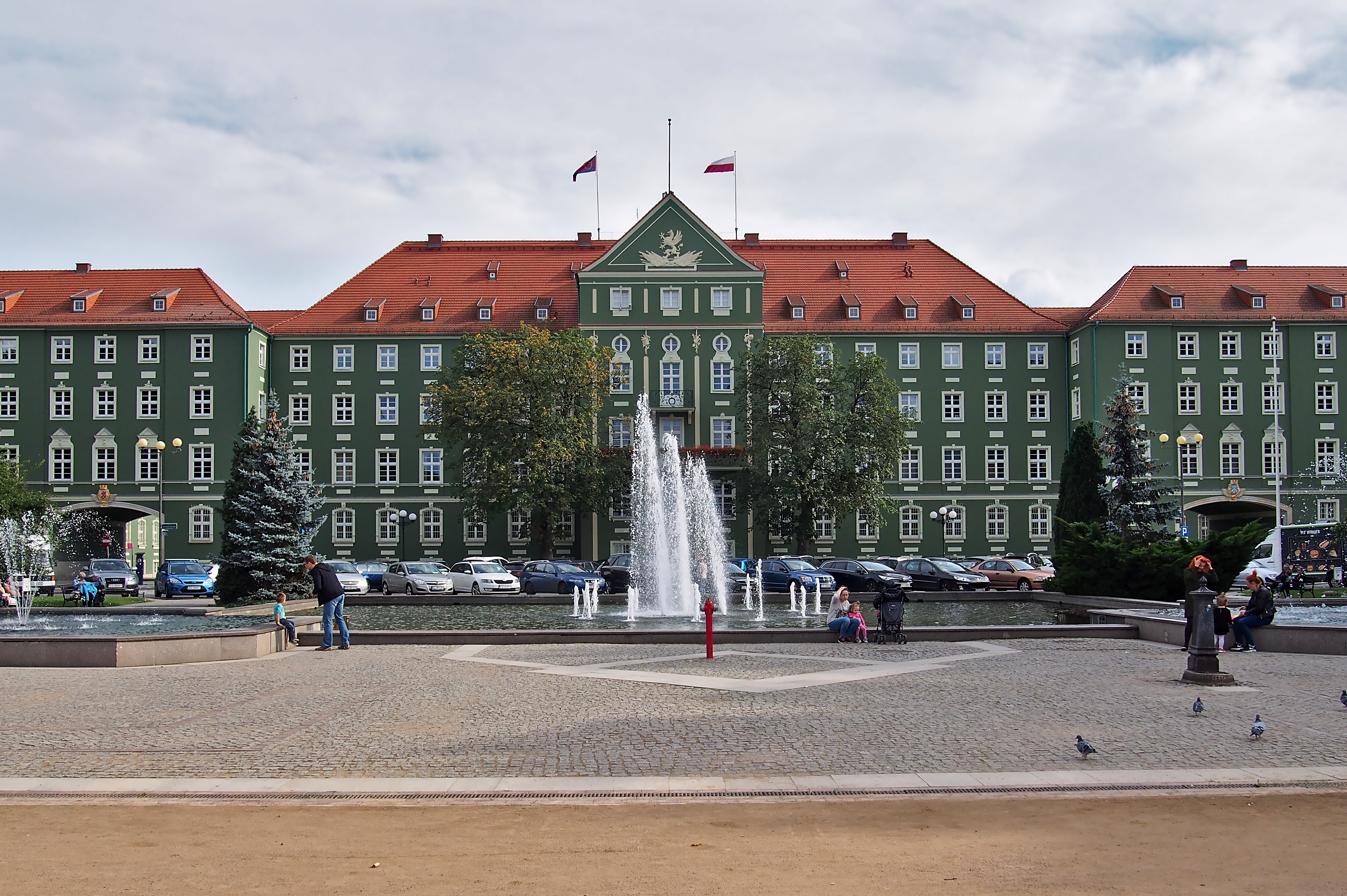
Town Hall

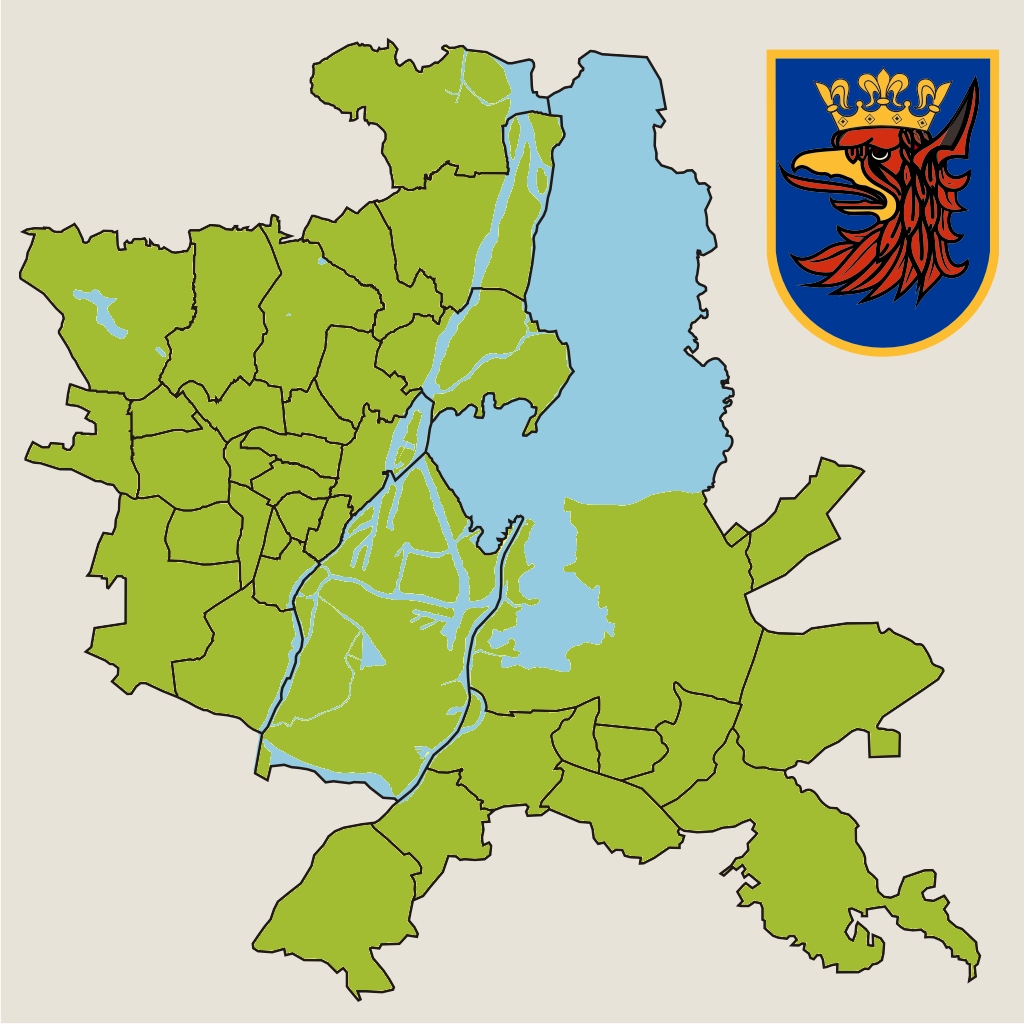
Szczecin's administrative divisions

The city is administratively divided into districts (Polish: dzielnica), which are further divided into smaller neighbourhoods. The governing bodies of the latter serve the role of auxiliary local government bodies called Neighbourhood Councils (Polish: Rady Osiedla). Elections for neighbourhood councils are held up to six months after each City Council election. Voter turnout is rather low (on 20 May 2007 it ranged from 1.03% to 27.75% and was 3.78% on average). Councillors are responsible mostly for small infrastructure like trees, park benches, playgrounds, etc. Other functions are mostly advisory.

- Dzielnica Śródmieście (City Centre) includes: Centrum, Drzetowo-Grabowo, Łękno, Międzyodrze-Wyspa Pucka, Niebuszewo-Bolinko, Nowe Miasto, Stare Miasto, Śródmieście-Północ, Śródmieście-Zachód, Turzyn.
- Dzielnica Północ (North) includes: Bukowo, Golęcino-Gocław, Niebuszewo, Skolwin, Stołczyn, Warszewo, Żelechowa.
- Dzielnica Zachód (West) includes: Arkońskie-Niemierzyn, Głębokie-Pilchowo, Gumieńce, Krzekowo-Bezrzecze, Osów, Pogodno, Pomorzany, Świerczewo, Zawadzkiego-Klonowica.
- Dzielnica Prawobrzeże (Right-Bank) includes: Bukowe-Klęskowo, Dąbie, Kijewo, Osiedle Majowe, Osiedle Słoneczne, Płonia-Śmierdnica-Jezierzyce, Podjuchy, Wielgowo-Sławociesze, Załom, Zdroje, Żydowce-Klucz.

=== Other historical neighbourhoods ===
Babin, Barnucin, Basen Górniczy, Błędów, Boleszyce, Bystrzyk, Cieszyce, Cieśnik, Dolina, Drzetowo, Dunikowo, Glinki, Grabowo, Jezierzyce, Kaliny, Kępa Barnicka, Kijewko, Kluczewko, Kłobucko, Kniewo, Kraśnica, Krzekoszów, Lotnisko, Łasztownia, Niemierzyn, Odolany, Oleszna, Podbórz, Port, Osiedle Przyjaźni, Rogatka, Rudnik, Sienna, Skoki, Słowieńsko, Sosnówko, Starków, Stoki, Struga, Śmierdnica, os.Świerczewskie, Trzebusz, Urok, Widok, Zdunowo.

== Demographics ==
Historical population
Year	Pop.	±%
1600	5,000	—
1720	6,081	+21.6%
1740	12,300	+102.3%
1812	21,255	+72.8%
1840	35,300	+66.1%
1852	48,028	+36.1%
1861	58,487	+21.8%
1872	76,000	+29.9%
1885	99,543	+31.0%
1905	224,119	+125.1%
1939	383,000	+70.9%
1946	72,948	−81.0%
1950	178,907	+145.3%
1960	269,318	+50.5%
1970	338,000	+25.5%
1978	384,948	+13.9%
1988	410,331	+6.6%
2002	415,399	+1.2%
2011	410,131	−1.3%
2021	396,168	−3.4%

Since the 12th-century Christianization of the city, the majority of the population were Catholics, then since the Renaissance era, up to the end of World War II, the majority of the population were Protestants (93% in 1890), and since 1945, the majority are again Catholics. Historically, the number of inhabitants doubled from 6,081 in 1720, to 12,360 in 1740, and reached 21,255 in 1812, with only 476 Catholics and 5 Jews. By 1852 the population was 48,028, and 58,487 ten years later (1861), including 1,065 Catholics and 1,438 Jews. In 1885, it was 99,543, and by 1905 it ballooned to 224,119 settlers (incl. the military), among them 209,152 Protestants, 8,635 Catholics and 3,010 Jews. In 1939, the number of inhabitants reached 268,421 persons according to German sources including 233,424 Protestants, 10,845 Catholics, and 1,102 Jews. The current population of Szczecin by comparison was 406,427 in 2009. Following the Revolution of Dignity, Szczecin, much like most other major urban centers in Poland, saw an unprecedented influx of foreign nationals, an overwhelming majority of them Ukrainians; in July 2017 26,000 of them were officially registered as living and working in Szczecin, with unofficial estimates going as high as 50,000, thus making up more than 10% of the city's inhabitants.

Number of inhabitants over the centuries

== Politics ==
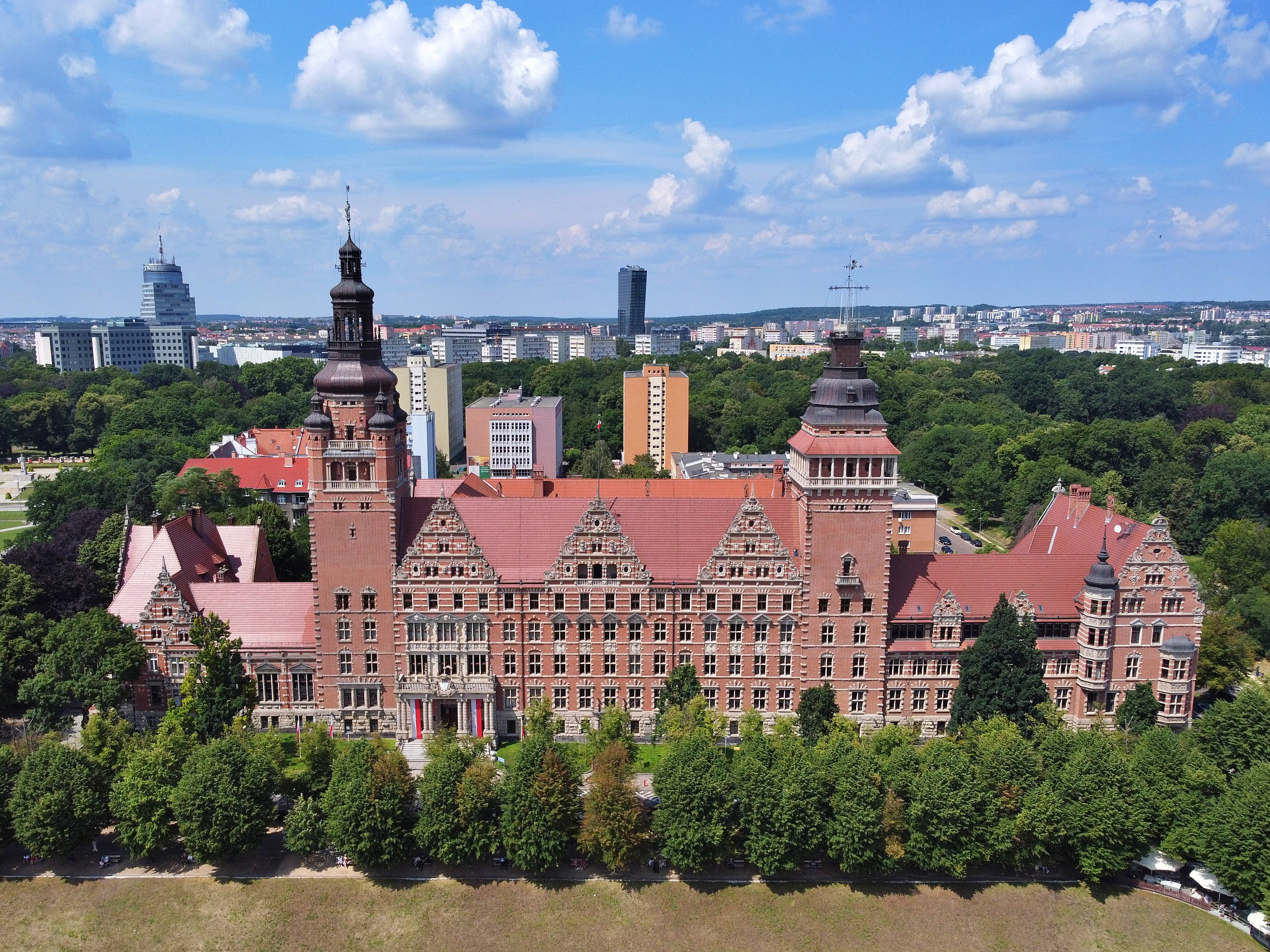
Szczecin Voivodeship Office

Recently, the city has favoured the centre right Civic Platform. Nearly two-thirds (64.54%) of votes cast in the second round of the 2010 presidential election went to the Civic Platform's Bronisław Komorowski, and in the following year's Polish parliamentary election the party won 46.75% of the vote in the Szczecin constituency with Law and Justice second garnering 21.66% and Palikot's Movement third with 11.8%.

=== Members of European Parliament (MEPs) from Szczecin ===
- Sławomir Nitras, PO, former MP in the Polish lower house of Parliament.
- Bogusław Liberadzki, SLD-UP, economist, former Minister of Transport.
- Marek Gróbarczyk, PiS, engineer and manager, Minister of Maritime Economy.

== Museums and galleries ==
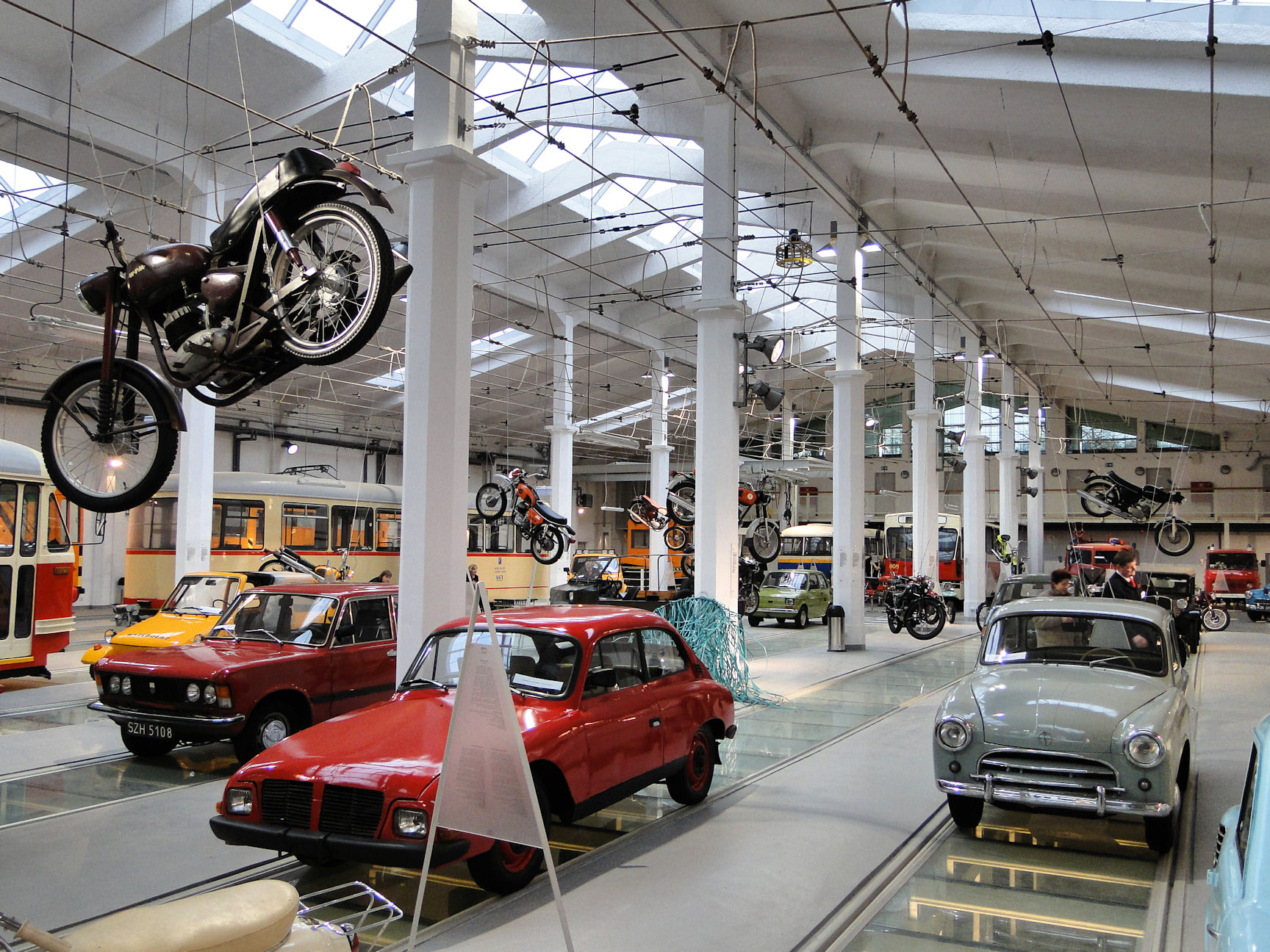
Interior of the Museum of Technology and Transport

- National Museum in Szczecin (Polish: Muzeum Narodowe w Szczecinie) is the largest cultural institution in the West Pomeranian Voivodeship. It has branches:
  - The Main Building of Muzeum Narodowe w Szczecinie, Wały Chrobrego 3 Street.
  - Szczecin's History Museum (Polish Muzeum Historii Szczecina) in the Old Town Hall, Szczecin, Księcia Mściwoja II Street.
  - The Old Art Gallery of the National Museum, Staromłyńska Street 27.
  - The Museum of Contemporary Art, Staromłyńska 1 Street.
  - The Narrow Gauge Railway Exhibition in Gryfice
  - Planned investments: Dialogue Center Breakthroughs (Polish Centrum Dialogu Przełomy) and Maritime Science Centre (Polish Muzeum Morskie – Centrum Nauki).
- Literature Museum (Polish Muzeum Literatury)
- EUREKA – the miracles of science.
- The Castle Museum (Polish Muzeum Zamkowe) in the Pomeranian Dukes' Castle, Szczecin.
- Museum of Technology and Transport (Polish Muzeum Techniki i Komunikacji – Zajezdnia Sztuki).

== Arts and entertainment ==
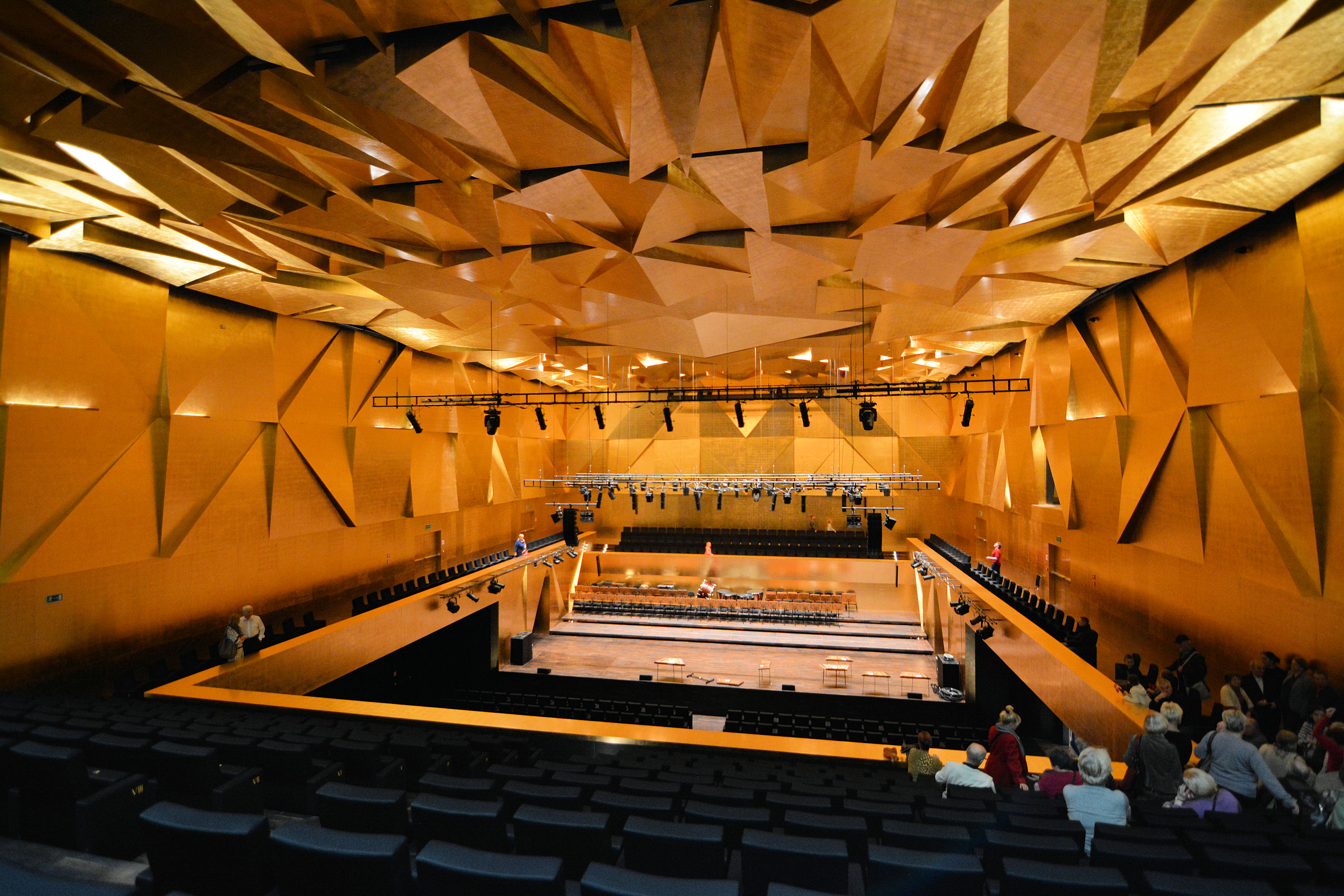

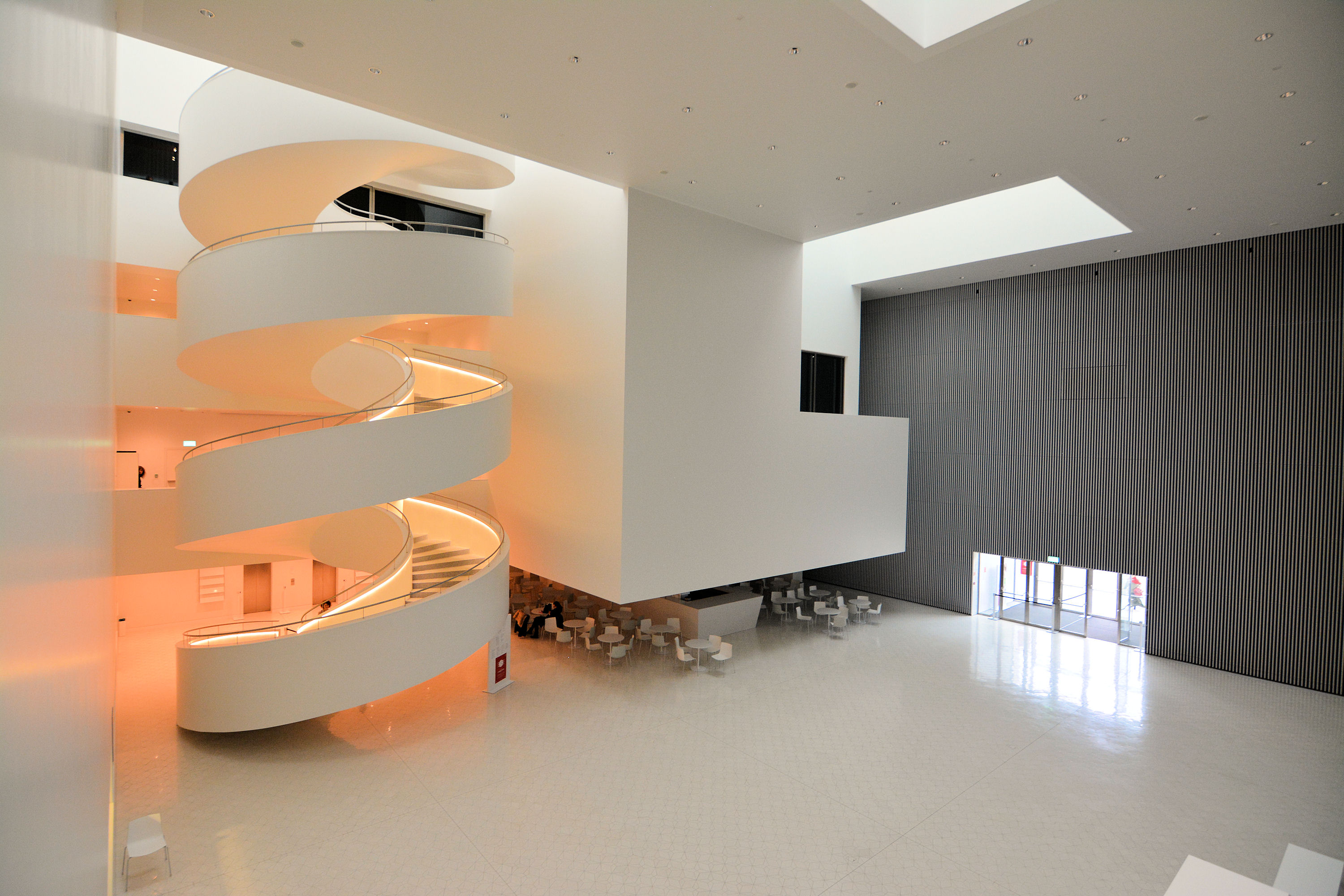
Interior of the Szczecin Philharmonic, which opened in 2014

There are a few theatres and cinemas in Szczecin:

- The Castle Cinema (Polish Kino Zamek)
- Pionier 1909 Cinema (Polish Kino Pionier 1909)
- Kana Theatre (Polish Teatr Kana)
- Modern Theatre (Polish Teatr Współczesny)
- Opera in the Castle (Polish Opera na Zamku)
- Polish Theatre in Szczecin (Polish Teatr Polski w Szczecinie)
- The Cellar by the Vault Cabaret (Polish Kabaret Piwnica przy Krypcie)
- The Crypt Theatre (Polish Teatr Krypta)
- The Pleciuga Puppetry Theatre (Polish Teatr Lalek Pleciuga)
- The Niema Theatre (Polish Teatr Niema)
- Szczecin Philharmonic

and many historic places as:

- Bismarck tower, Szczecin
- (ruins of) The Quistorp's Tower (Polish Wieża Quistorpa)
- Napoleon mound (at the intersection of Klonowica Street and Unii Lubelskiej Street)

The statue, Monument of Sailor stands at the Grunwald Square at John Paul II Avenue.

== Local cuisine ==
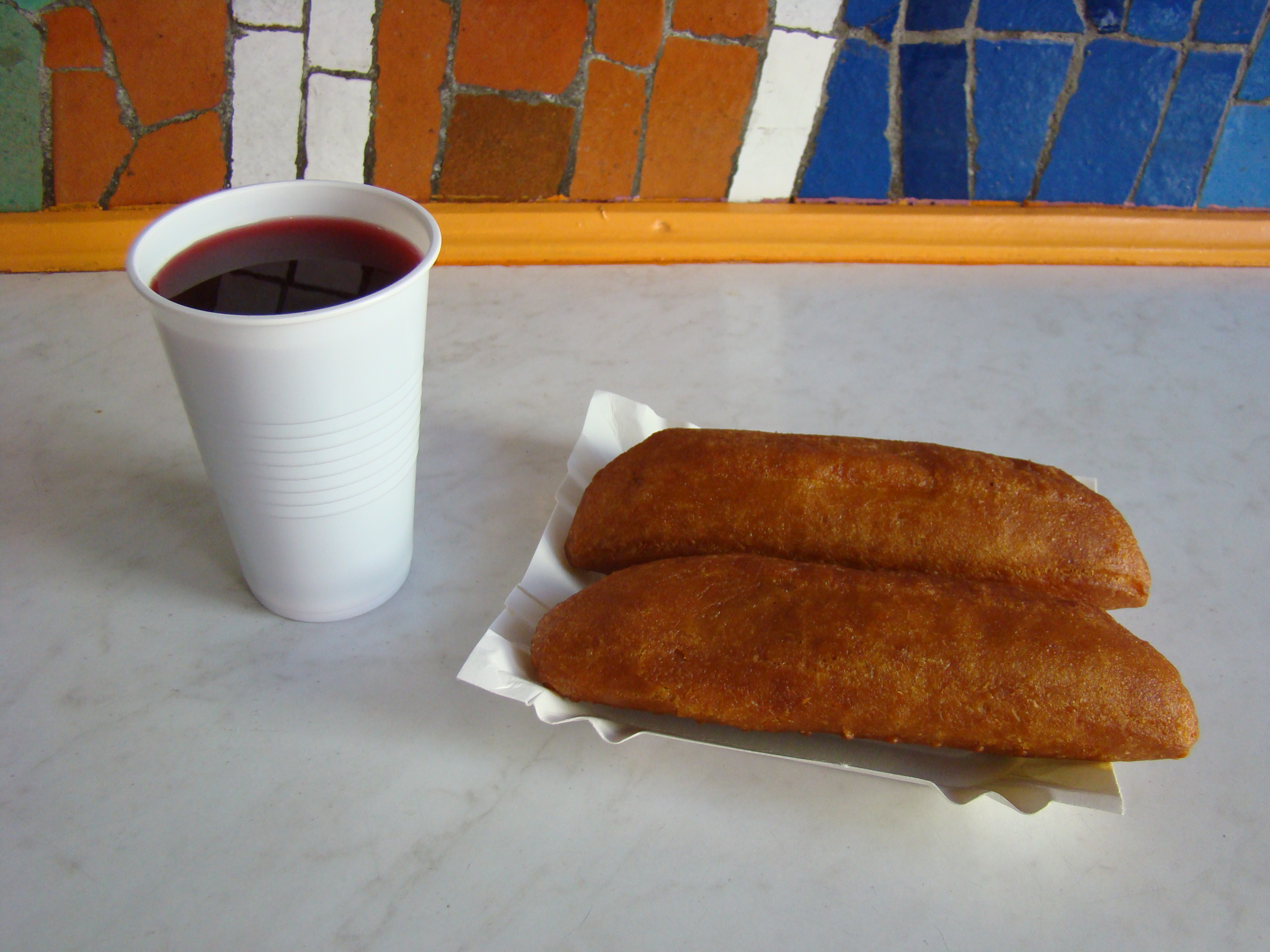
Pasztecik szczeciński with clear borscht, a local fast food

The local cuisine in Szczecin was mostly shaped in the mid-20th century by people who settled in the city from other parts and regions of Poland, including the former Eastern Borderlands. The most renowned dishes of the area are pasztecik szczeciński and paprykarz szczeciński. Other local traditional foods and drinks include Szczecin gingerbread and beer.

Pasztecik szczeciński is a deep-fried yeast dough traditionally stuffed with minced meat (pork and beef) or vegetarian filling - cheese and mushrooms or cabbage and mushrooms, served in specialised bars as a fast food. Pasztecik szczeciński is usually served with clear red borscht.

Paprykarz szczeciński is a paste made by mixing fish paste (around 50%) with rice, onion, tomato concentrate, vegetable oil, salt and a mixture of spices including chili powder to put it on a sandwich. It is available in most grocery stores in the country.

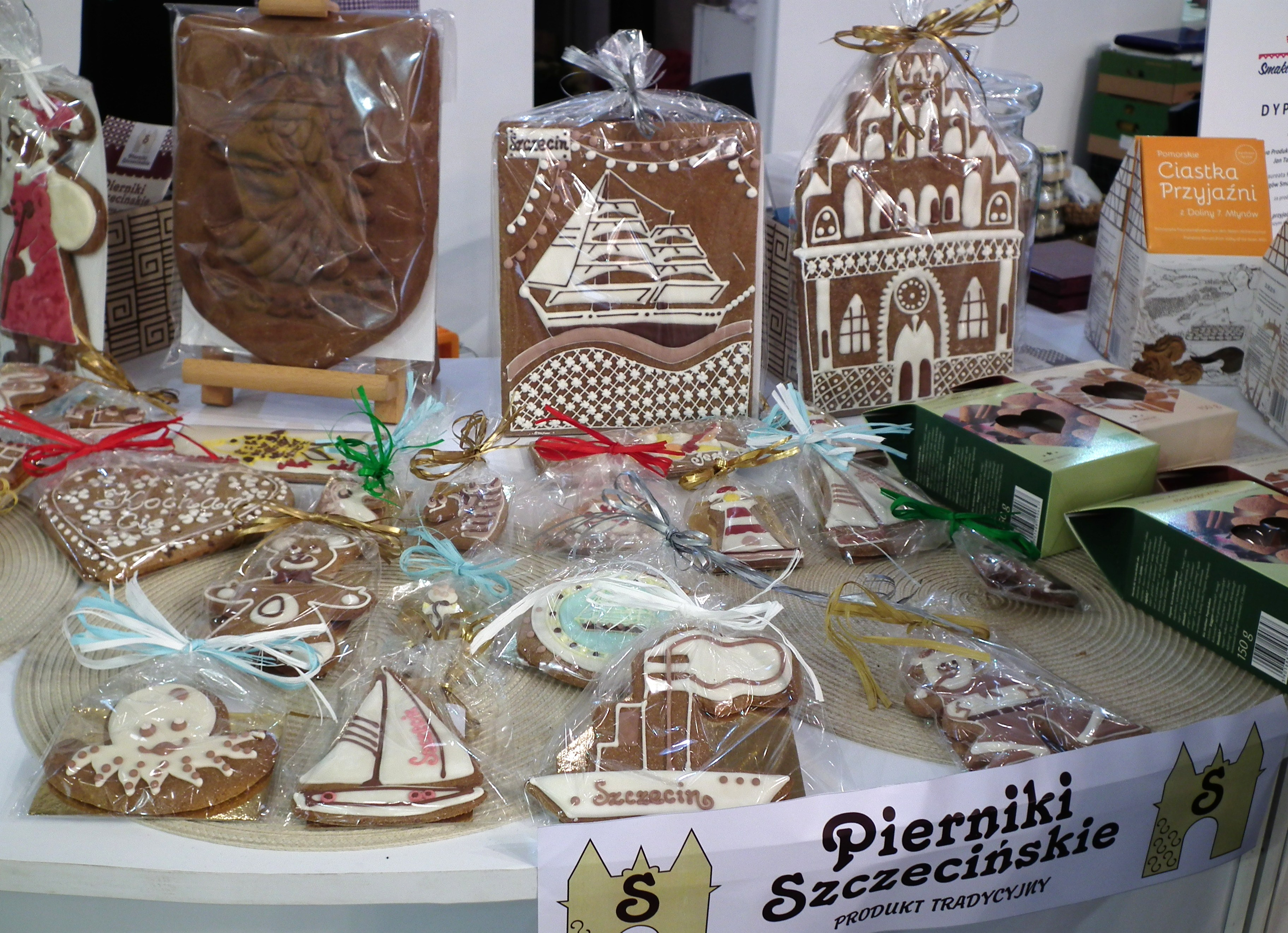
Szczecin gingerbread

Szczecin gingerbread (pierniki szczecińskie) is a traditional local gingerbread glazed with chocolate or sugar with decorations mostly referring either to the city's architecture or to maritime motifs.

Szczecin beer (piwo szczecińskie) includes various types of traditional local Polish beer: light, amber, and wheat beer. The city's brewing traditions go back over a thousand years.

The word "szczeciński" or "szczecińskie" in the names of the products is an adjective from the name of the city of Szczecin, the place of its origin.

== Sports ==
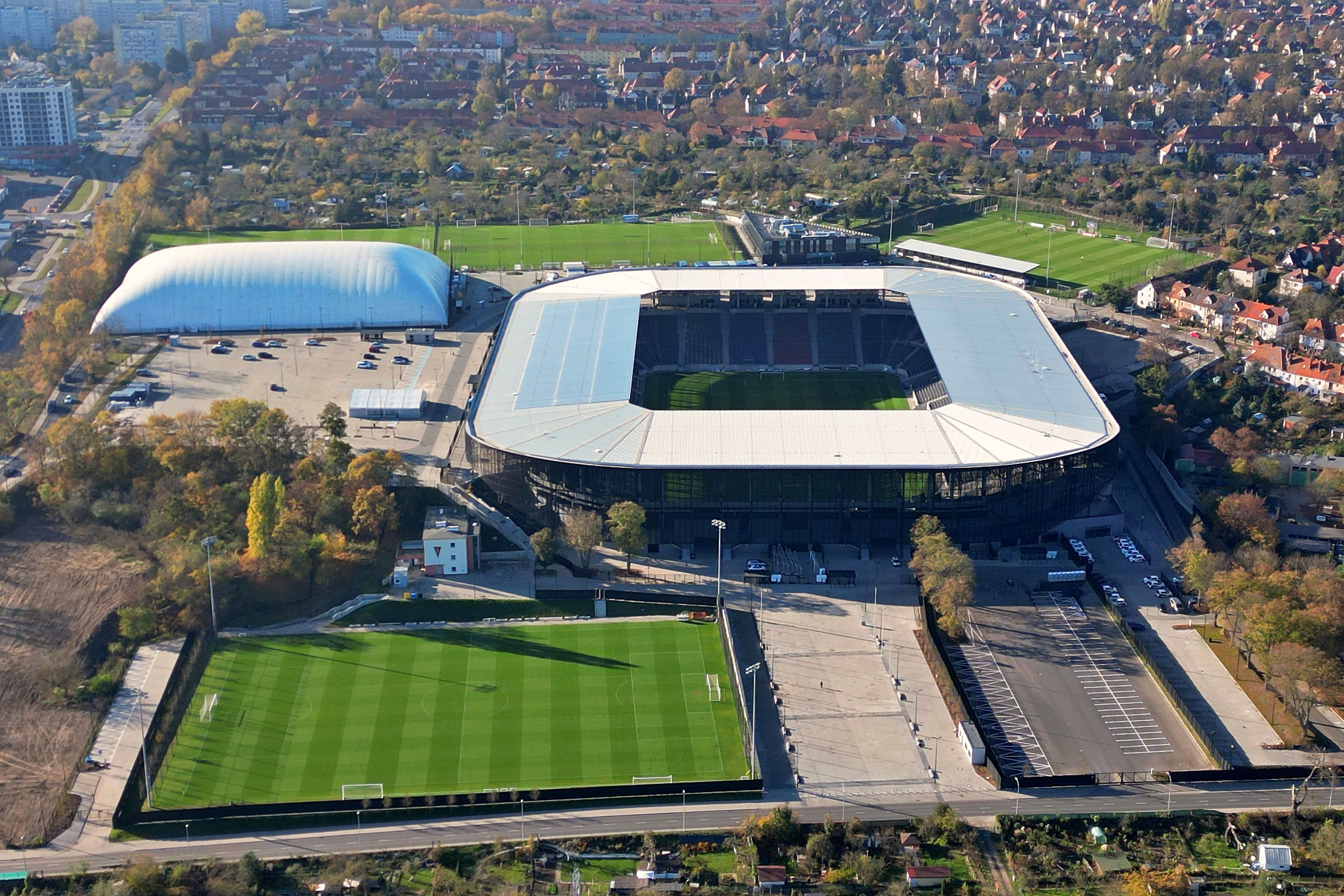
Stadium of Pogoń Szczecin

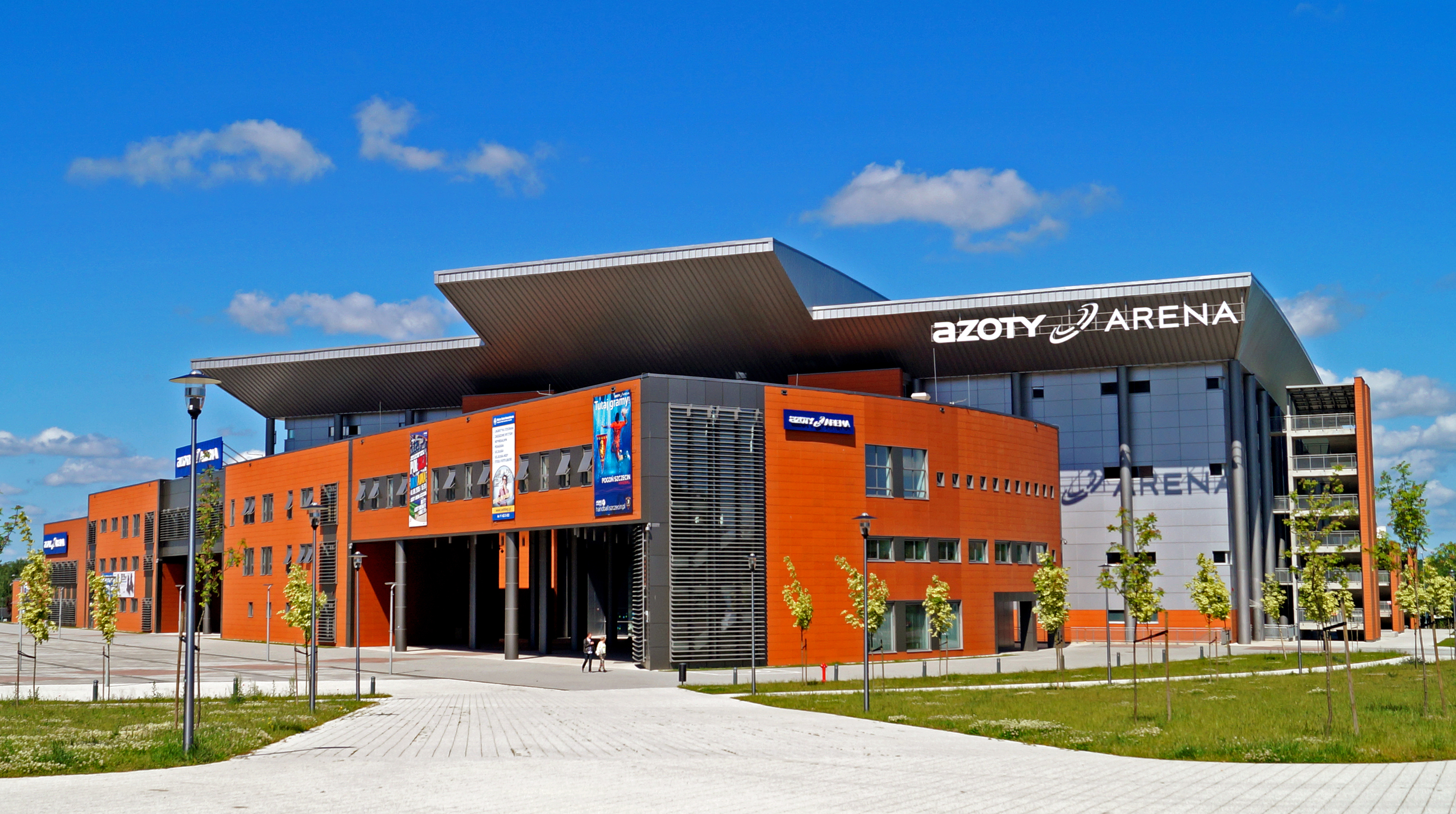
Netto Arena

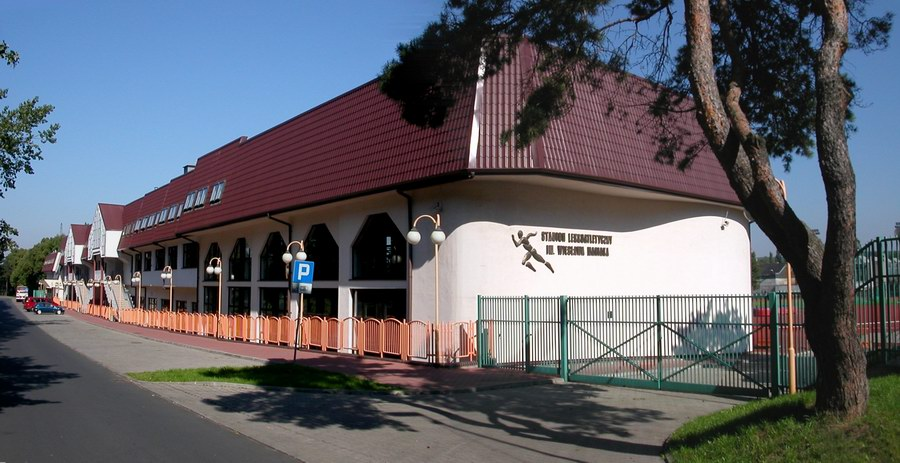
Athletics stadium

There are many popular professional sports teams in Szczecin area. The most popular sport today is probably football thanks to Pogoń Szczecin. Amateur sports are played by thousands of Szczecin citizens and also in schools of all levels (elementary, secondary, university).

Professional sports teams
Club	Sport	League	Trophies
Pogoń Szczecin	Football (men's)	Ekstraklasa	0
Pogoń Szczecin	Football (women's)	Ekstraliga	1 Polish Championship (2024)
Wilki Morskie Szczecin	Basketball (men's)	Polish Basketball League	1 Polish Championship (2023)
Świt Szczecin	Football (men's)	II liga	0
Pogoń Szczecin	Handball (women's)	Liga Centralna	3 Polish Championships (1983, 1986, 1991); 4 Polish Cups (1971, 1980, 1986, 1992)
Pogoń Szczecin	Handball (men's)	Liga Centralna	0

Other notable teams include:

- Arkonia Szczecin – football team, which competes in the lower divisions, but played in the top division in the past, and one of the most successful Polish water polo clubs
- KS Stal Szczecin – 15 youth and junior teams, 1 senior, being in 4th regional league in the 2008/2009 season
- KS Piast Szczecin – women's volleyball team, (Seria A in the 2003/2004 and 2004/2005 seasons)
- Łącznościowiec Szczecin - women's handball team
- OSoT Szczecin - trains Polish and foreign pole vaulters
- SEJK Pogoń Szczecin - sailing team
- Wicher Warszewo – futsal team playing in Środowiskowa Liga Futsalu (Futsal League) – two regional Futsal League: 2nd place in 2006/2007 season – promotion in the first regional Futsal League
- Husaria Szczecin – A karate kyoukishin and diving sports club
- Szczecin Titans (formerly Szczecin Dukes) – senior baseball team

As can be seen above, many teams in Szczecin are named after Pogoń Lwów, a team from the Eastern Borderlands.

=== Amateur leagues ===
- Halowa Amatorska Liga Pilkarska – Hall Amateur Football League
- Halowa Liga Pilki Noznej – Hall Football League
- Szczecinska Liga Amatorskiej Koszykowki – Szczecin Amateur Basketball League
- Szczecinska Amatorska Liga Pilki Siatkowej – Szczecin Amateur Volleyball League – women league, 1st, 2nd and 3rd men league
- Elita Professional Sport – Elita Hall Football League – 1st and 2nd league, futsal cup
- Kaskada Szczecin Rugby Club – club rugby – 7 and 15 league, rugby cup

==== Cyclic events ====
Every year in September the men's tennis tournament Pekao Szczecin Open is held in Szczecin. In August, a marathon is organized in Szczecin.

== Economy and transport ==
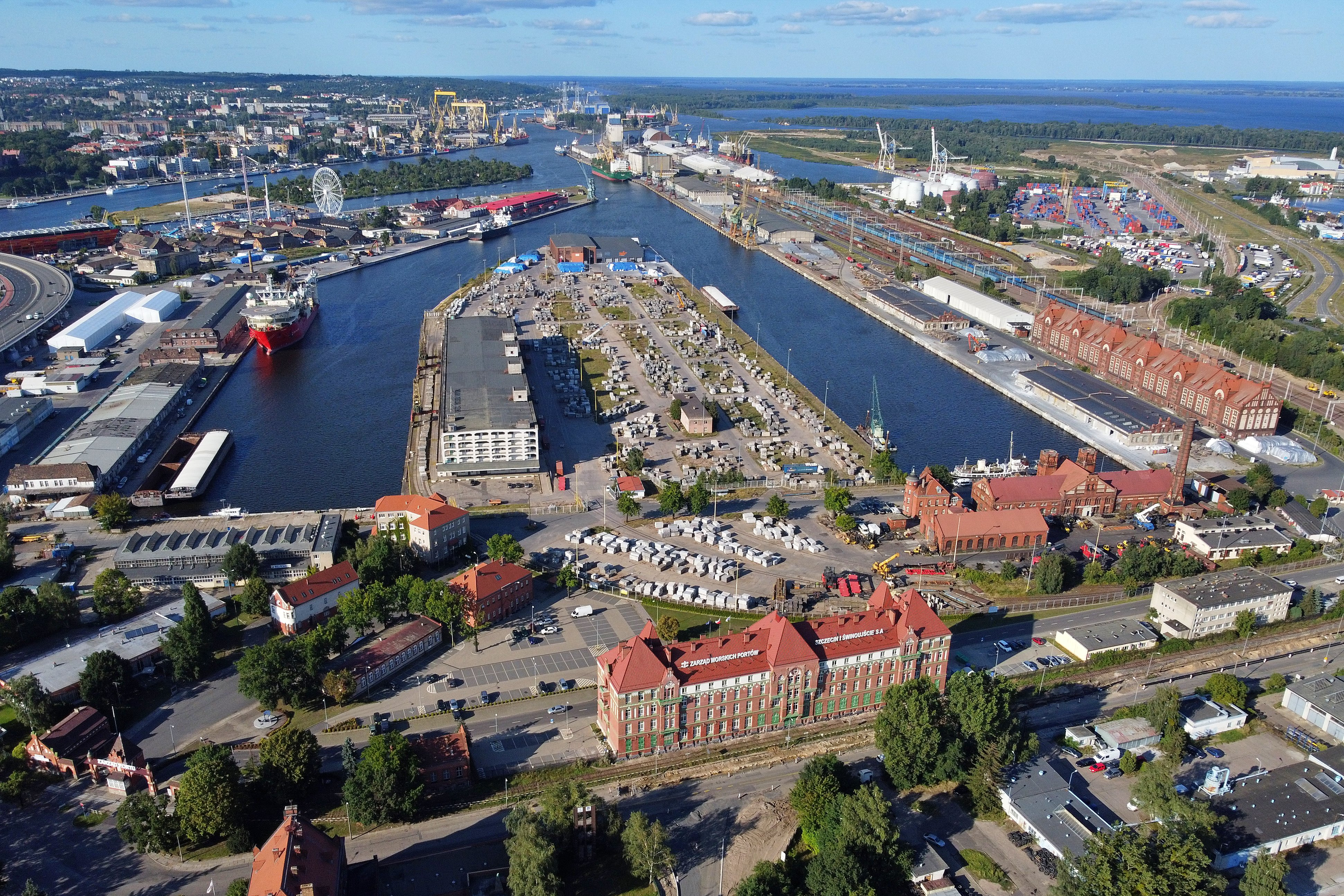
Port of Szczecin

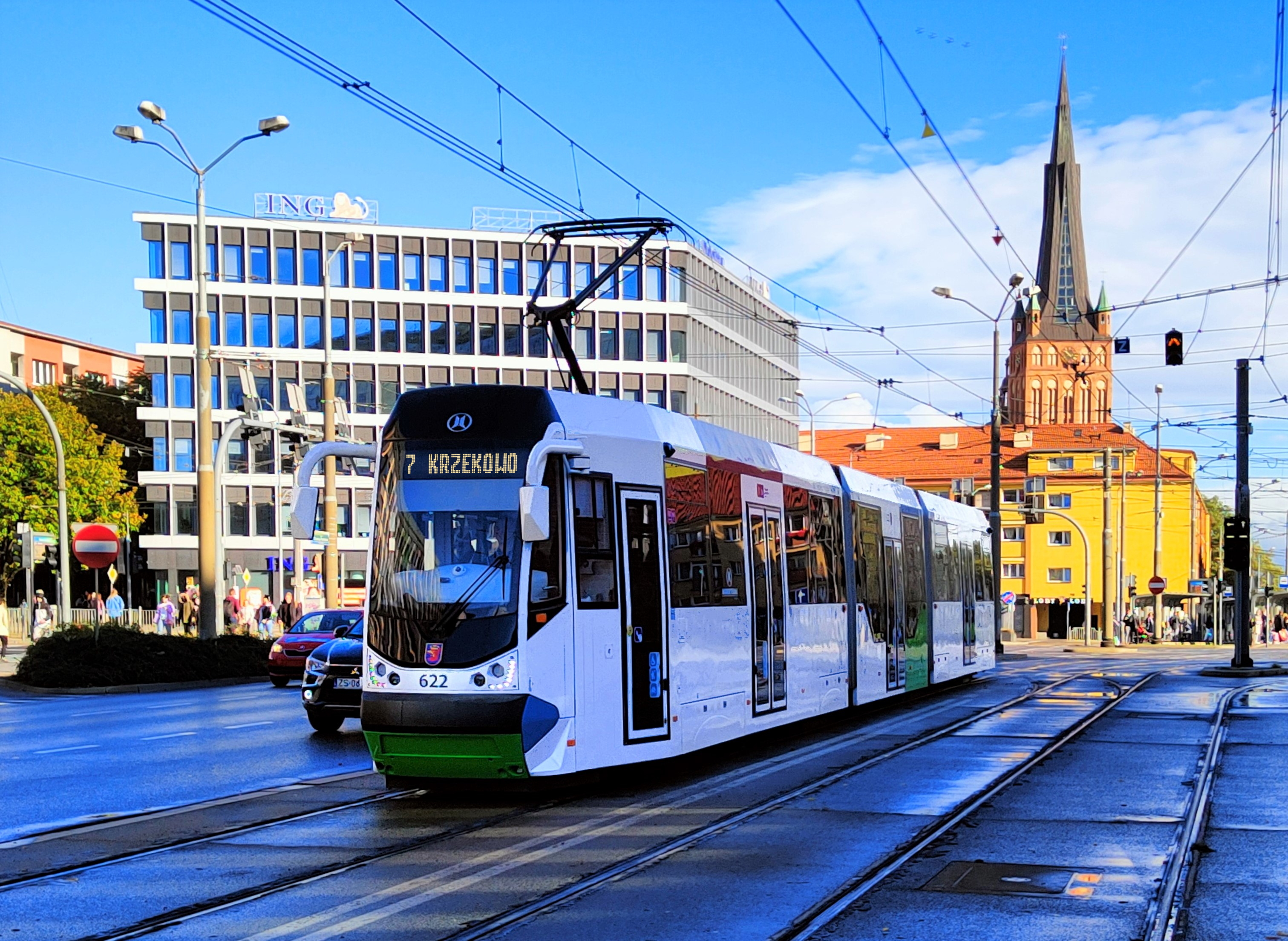
Moderus Beta tram, in the city's green and white livery

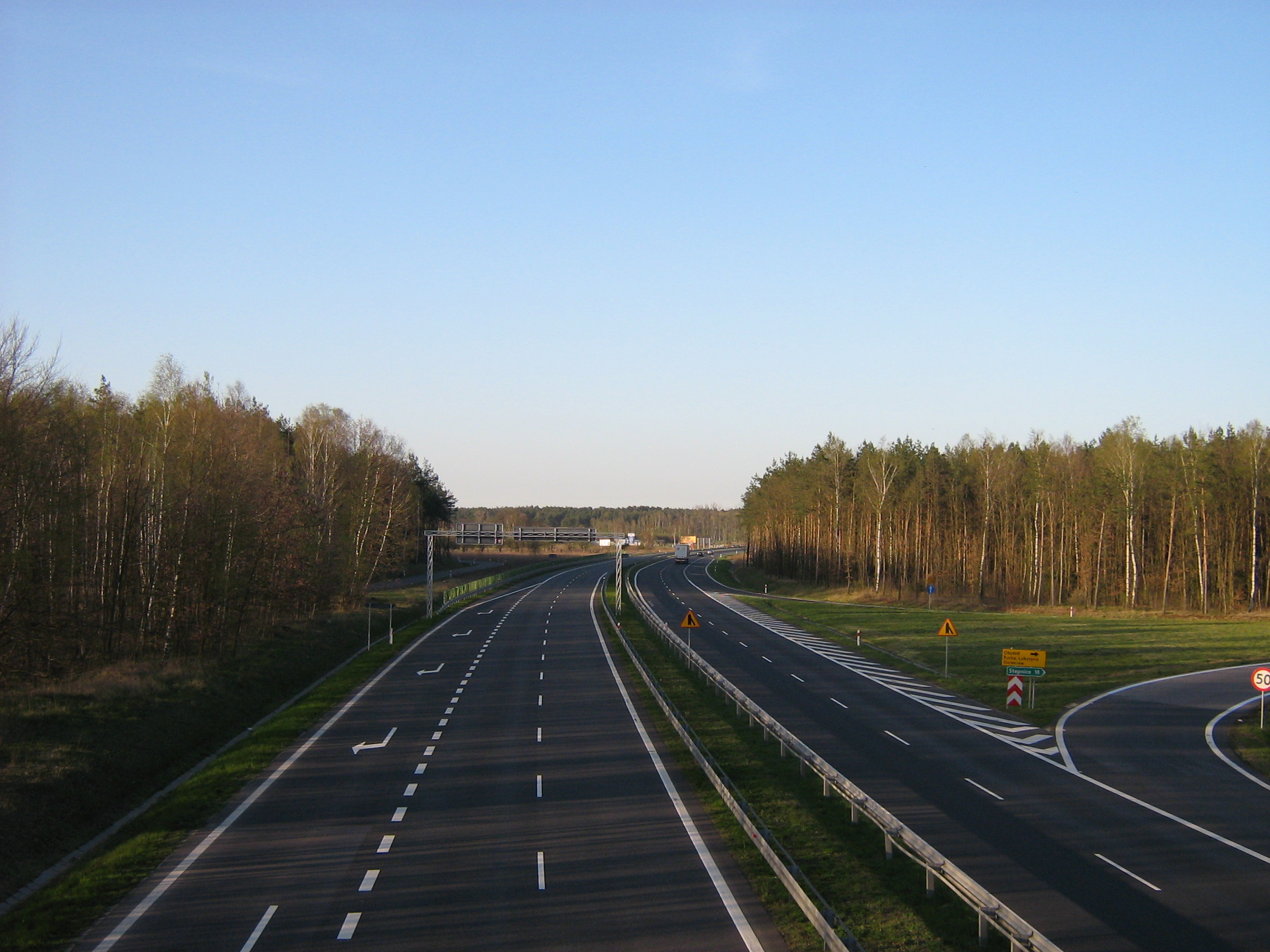
The S3 Expressway links Szczecin with its airport (at Goleniów) and Baltic ferry terminal (in Świnoujście), as well as with the major cities of Western Poland to the south – Gorzów Wielkopolski and Zielona Góra.

=== Economy ===
Szczecin is a center of the maritime economy; it employs 13,279 people. The seaport of Szczecin serves shipowners from all over the world and is the home port of two shipping companies: Polsteam and Euroafrica. In addition, other maritime-related companies are headquartered here.

In 2013, a subzone of the Szczecin-Kostrzyn-Slubice Special Economic Zone was established.

As of September 2016, the number of registered unemployed in Szczecin included about 8,400 residents, representing an unemployment rate of 5.0% to the economically active population.

The average employee salary in October 2012 was PLN 3,807.73, with the number of employed workers in Szczecin - 90,754 people. According to data from the District Labor Office in Szczecin, effective 1 January 2023, the minimum wage is PLN 3,490, while the average salary of residents of the capital of West Pomerania is at PLN 6,733.49.

In 2009, the average gross monthly salary in the enterprise sector in Szczecin was PLN 3,439.94.

Szczecin's GDP is PLN 20.255 billion, which is 1/3 of the GDP of the entire province. There are 49497 zlotys per capita, about 40% more than the result for the province.

=== Air ===
Szczecin is served by Solidarity Szczecin–Goleniów Airport, which is 47 kilometres (29 miles) northeast of central Szczecin. There is also a grass airstrip within city limits, the Szczecin-Dąbie Airstrip.

=== Trams ===
Szczecin has a tram network comprising 12 tram lines serving 95 tram stops and measuring 110.77 km (69 mi) in length. Tram transport is operated by the Tramwaje Szczecińskie (TS).

Szczecin's first horse tram opened in 1879, running from Gałczyńskiego Square to Staszica Street. In 1896, the first line using electric traction was opened. By 1900, the horse trams had been entirely replaced by electric trams.

=== Buses ===
Szczecin has a bus network of 70 bus routes. Bus transport is operated by 4 companies: SPA Dąbie, SPA Klonowica, SPPK and PKS Szczecin.

Of all bus routes, 50 lines are designated as normal. At nighttime, Szczecin is served by a night bus network of 16 routes. There are also 7 express bus lines, which do not serve all stops on their route.

=== Roads ===
The recently upgraded A6 motorway serves as the southern bypass of the city, and connects to the German A11 autobahn (portions of which are currently undergoing upgrade), from where one can reach Berlin in about 90 minutes (about 150 km (93 mi)). Other important highways are the S3 Expressway, linking Szczecin with the more southern cities of Gorzów Wielkopolski, Zielona Góra and Legnica, and the S6 Expressway, connecting Szczecin with Koszalin (and eventually Gdańsk once the easternmost section is completed). Through intersections with other highways, Szczecin has convenient highway connections with a number of other major Polish cities, such as Poznań, Łódź, Wrocław, Katowice, Warsaw and Kraków. Also planned is the construction of the S10 highway to connect the city with Bydgoszcz, Toruń, Płock and Warsaw.

=== Rail ===
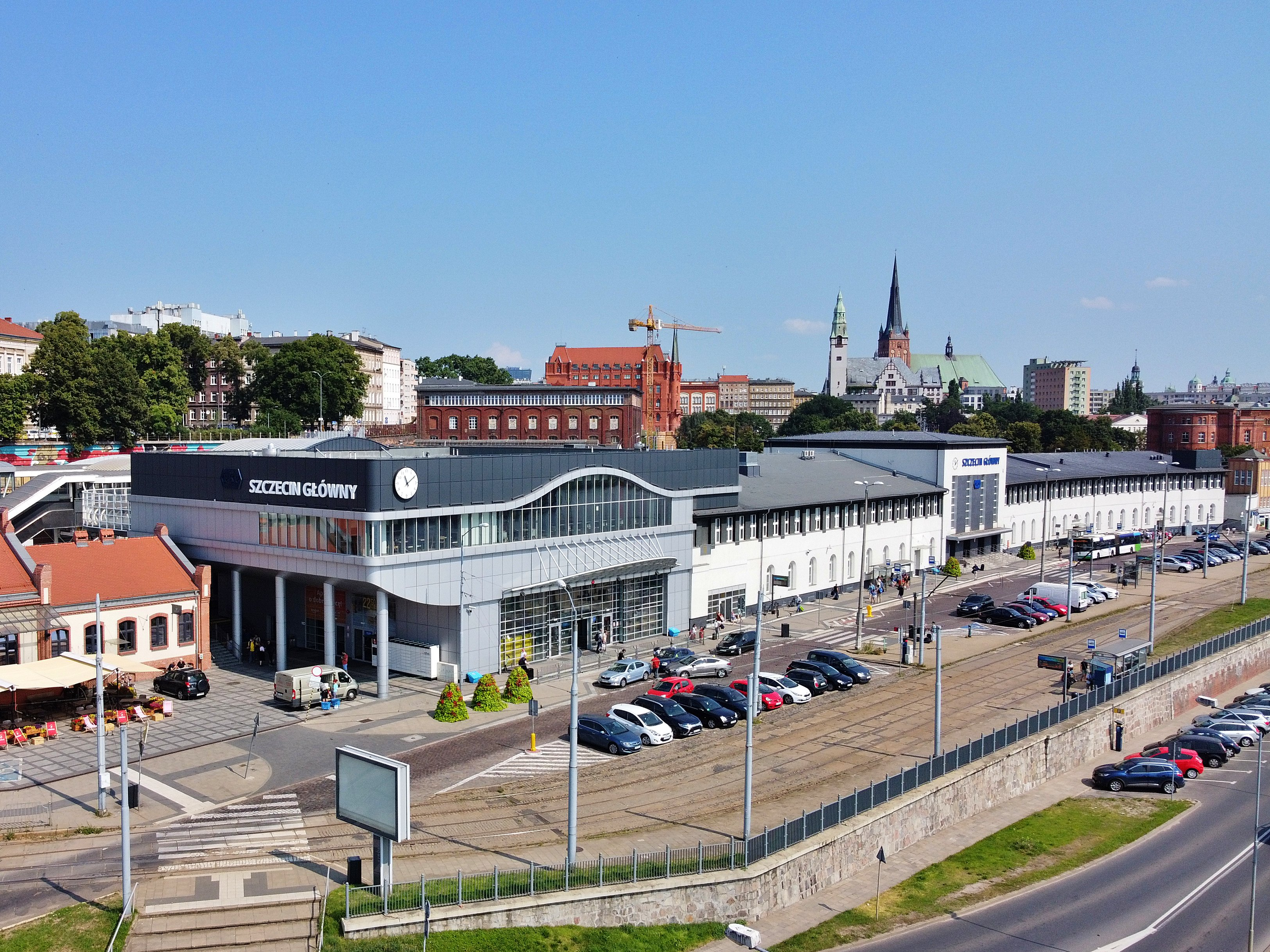
Szczecin Główny railway station

The main railway station – Szczecin Główny railway station – is situated in the city centre (Kolumba Street). Szczecin has good railway connections with "Solidarity" Szczecin–Goleniów Airport and the rest of Poland, e.g., Świnoujście, Kołobrzeg, Poznań, Wrocław, Warsaw and Gdańsk. Szczecin is also connected with Germany (Berlin (Gesundbrunnen) and through Pasewalk to Neubrandenburg and Lübeck), but only by two single-track, non-electrified lines. Because of this, the rail connection between Berlin and Szczecin is much slower and less convenient than what is typical for two European cities of that size and proximity.

=== Port ===
The Port of Szczecin is the third largest in Poland and handles over 32 million tons of cargo annually. It is a harbour of the Baltic Sea and the Oder river.

== Education and science ==
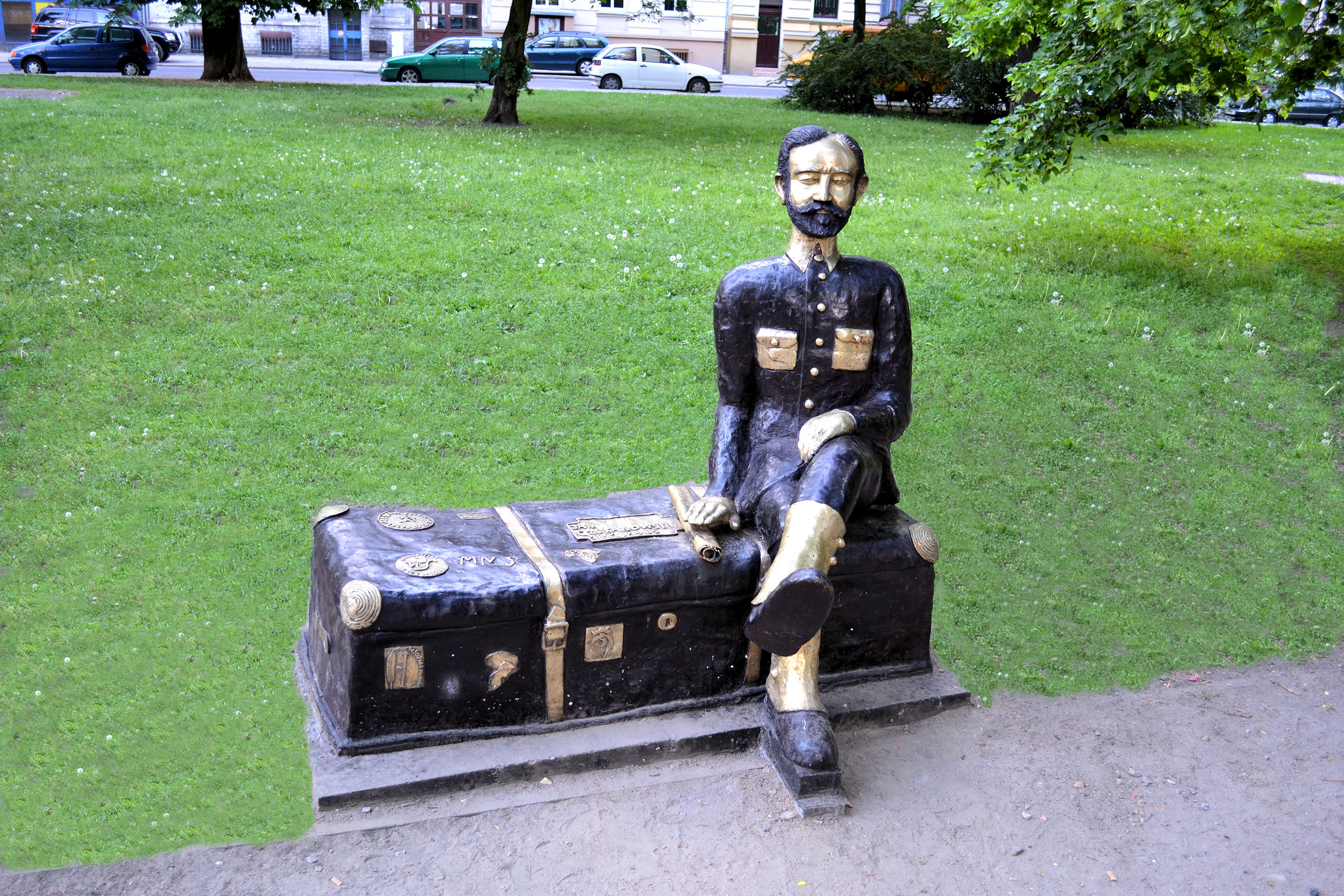
The monument to Jan Czekanowski, the president of Polish Copernicus Society of Naturalists (1923–1924), at the Anders Square

- University of Szczecin (Polish: Uniwersytet Szczeciński), with 35,000 students; rector: Waldemar Tarczyński
- West Pomeranian University of Technology (Polish: Zachodniopomorski Uniwersytet Technologiczny)
- Pomeranian Medical University (Polish: Pomorski Uniwersytet Medyczny)
- Art Academy of Szczecin (Polish: Akademia Sztuki)
- Maritime University of Szczecin (Polish: Akademia Morska w Szczecinie)
- WSB Merito Universities – WSB Merito University in Poznań, departments of Economics
- The West Pomeranian Business School (Polish: Zachodniopomorska Szkoła Biznesu)
- Higher School of Public Administration in Szczecin (Polish: Wyższa Szkoła Administracji Publicznej w Szczecinie)
- High Theological Seminary in Szczecin (Polish: Arcybiskupie Wyższe Seminarium Duchowne w Szczecinie)
- Higher School of Applied Arts (Polish: Wyższa Szkoła Sztuki Użytkowej)
- Academy of European Integration (Polish: Wyższa Szkoła Integracji Europejskiej)
- Wyższa Szkoła Ekonomiczno-Turystyczna
- Wyższa Szkoła Humanistyczna TWP
- Wyższa Szkoła Języków Obcych
- Wyższa Szkoła Techniczno-Ekonomiczna
- Wyższa Szkoła Zawodowa - Collegium Balticum
- Wyższa Szkoła Zawodowa "OECONOMICUS" PTE
- Wyższa Szkoła Zarządzania
Universities in Szczecin

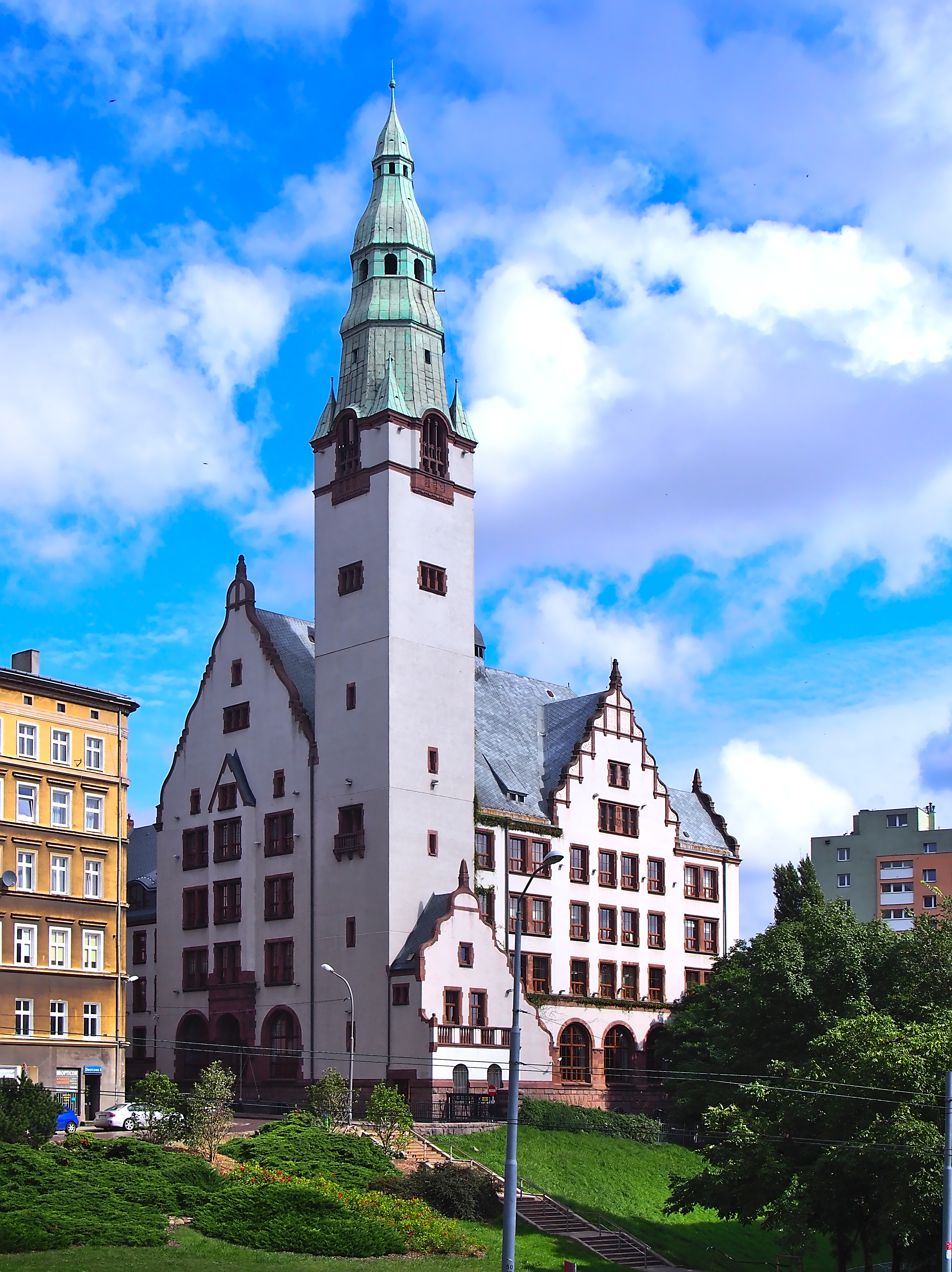
Pomeranian Medical University

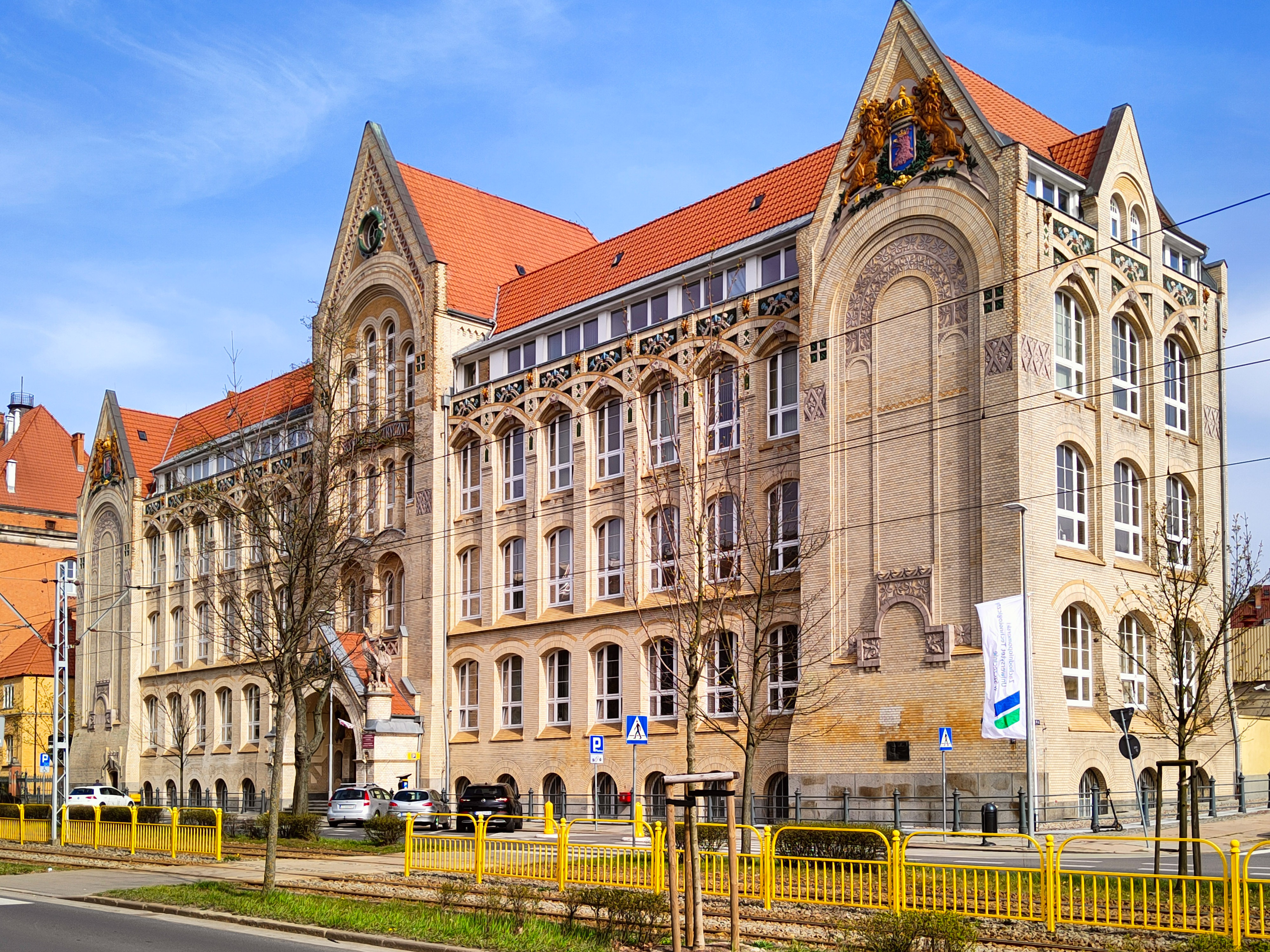
West Pomeranian University of Technology

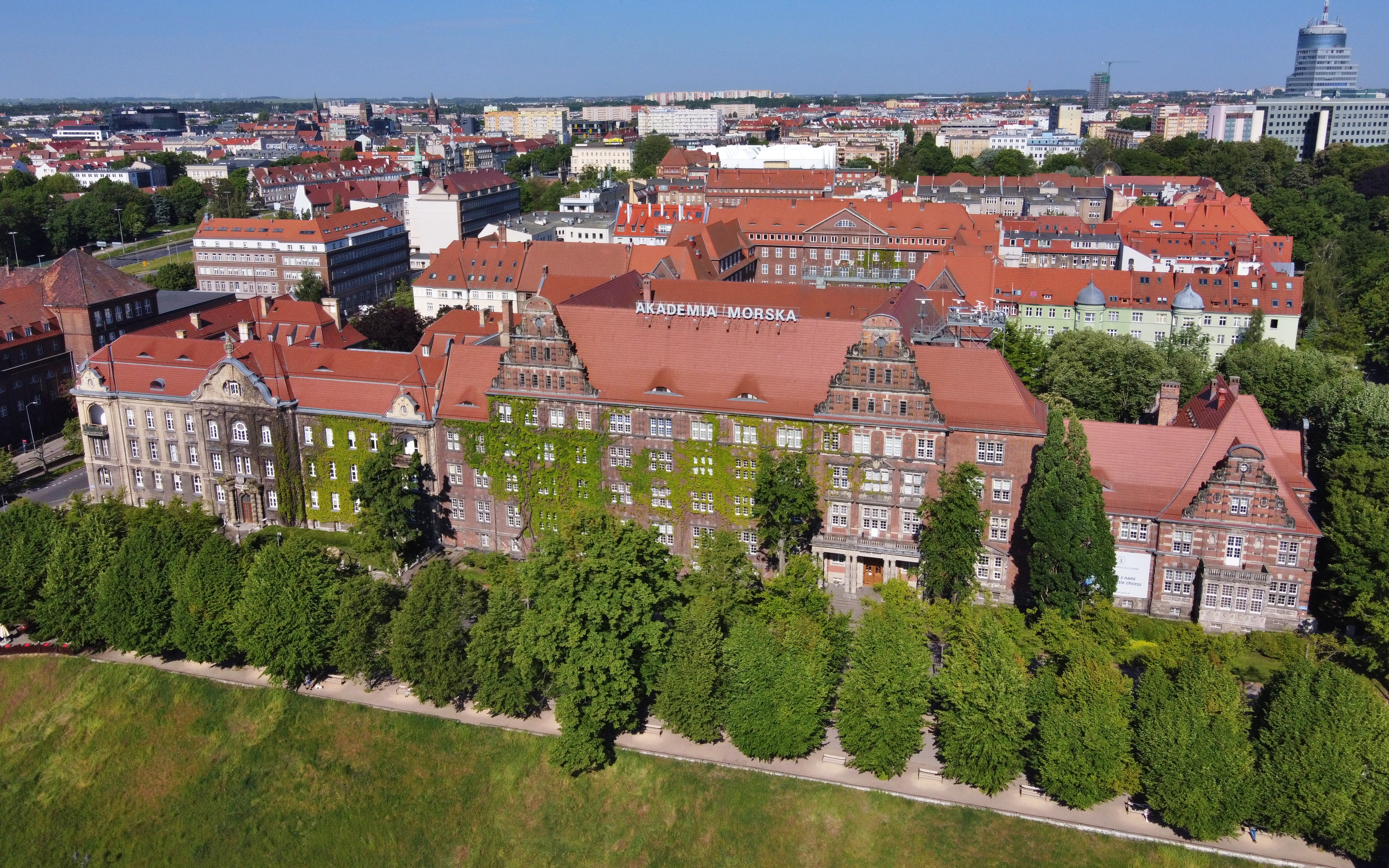
Maritime University of Szczecin

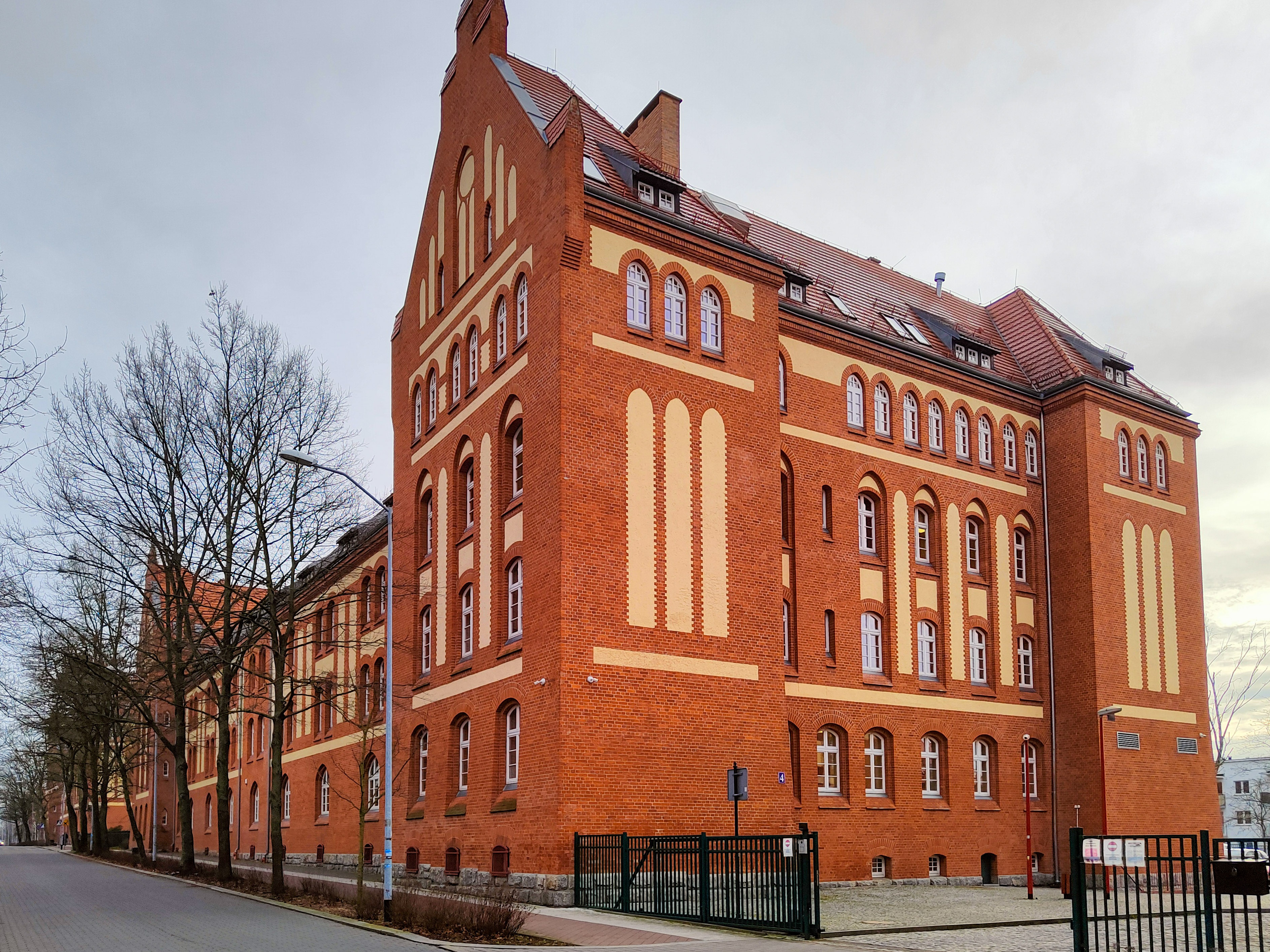
University of Szczecin, Faculty of Humanities

=== Scientific and regional organisations ===
- Western Pomeranian Institute (Polish: Instytut Zachodnio-Pomorski)
- Szczecin Scientific Society (Polish: Szczecińskie Towarzystwo Naukowe)
- local branches of Polish scientific societies in many disciplines, including Polish Philosophical Society, Polish Historical Society, Polish Philological Society, Polish Mathematical Society, Polish Economic Society, Polish Geographical Society, Polish Copernicus Society of Naturalists, Polish Phytopathological Society, Polish Parasitological Society and many medical societies
- local branches of students' societies, e.g., AIESEC, International Federation of Medical Students' Associations (IFMSA) and Polish Association of Dental Students

== Famous people ==
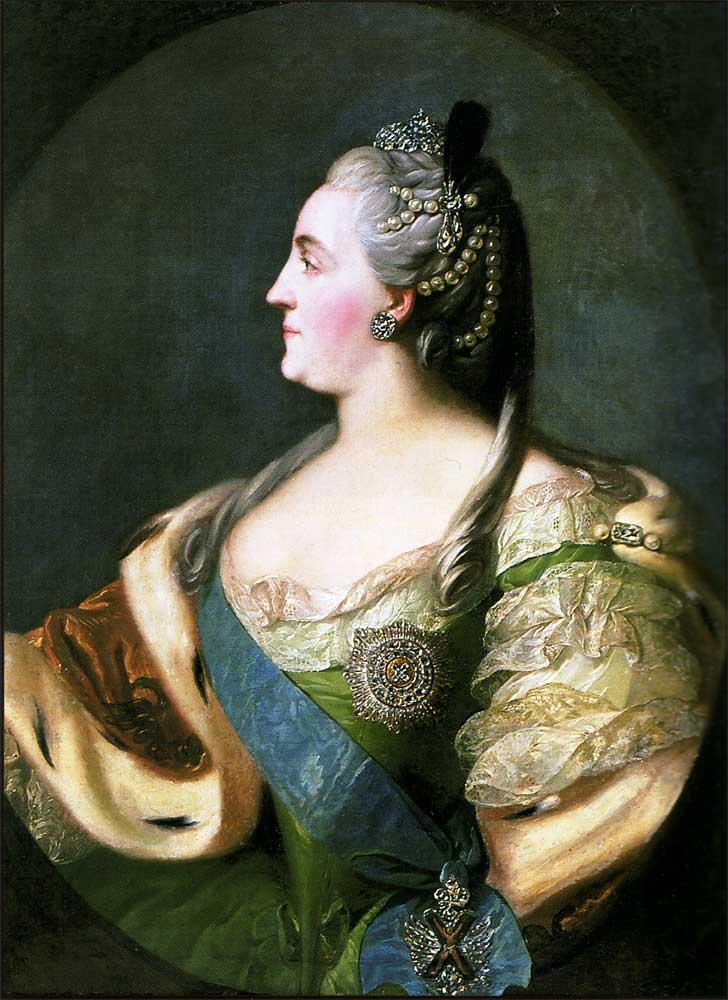
Catherine the Great was born in the city.

Over the long course of its history Szczecin has been a place of birth and of residence for many famous individuals, including Empress Catherine the Great of Russia, composer Carl Loewe, writer Alfred Döblin, actress Dita Parlo, mathematician Hermann Günther Grassmann, Roman Catholic priest Carl Lampert, poet Konstanty Ildefons Gałczyński, Helena Majdaniec – "the queen of Polish Twist", and singer Violetta Villas.

== International relations ==
=== Consulates ===
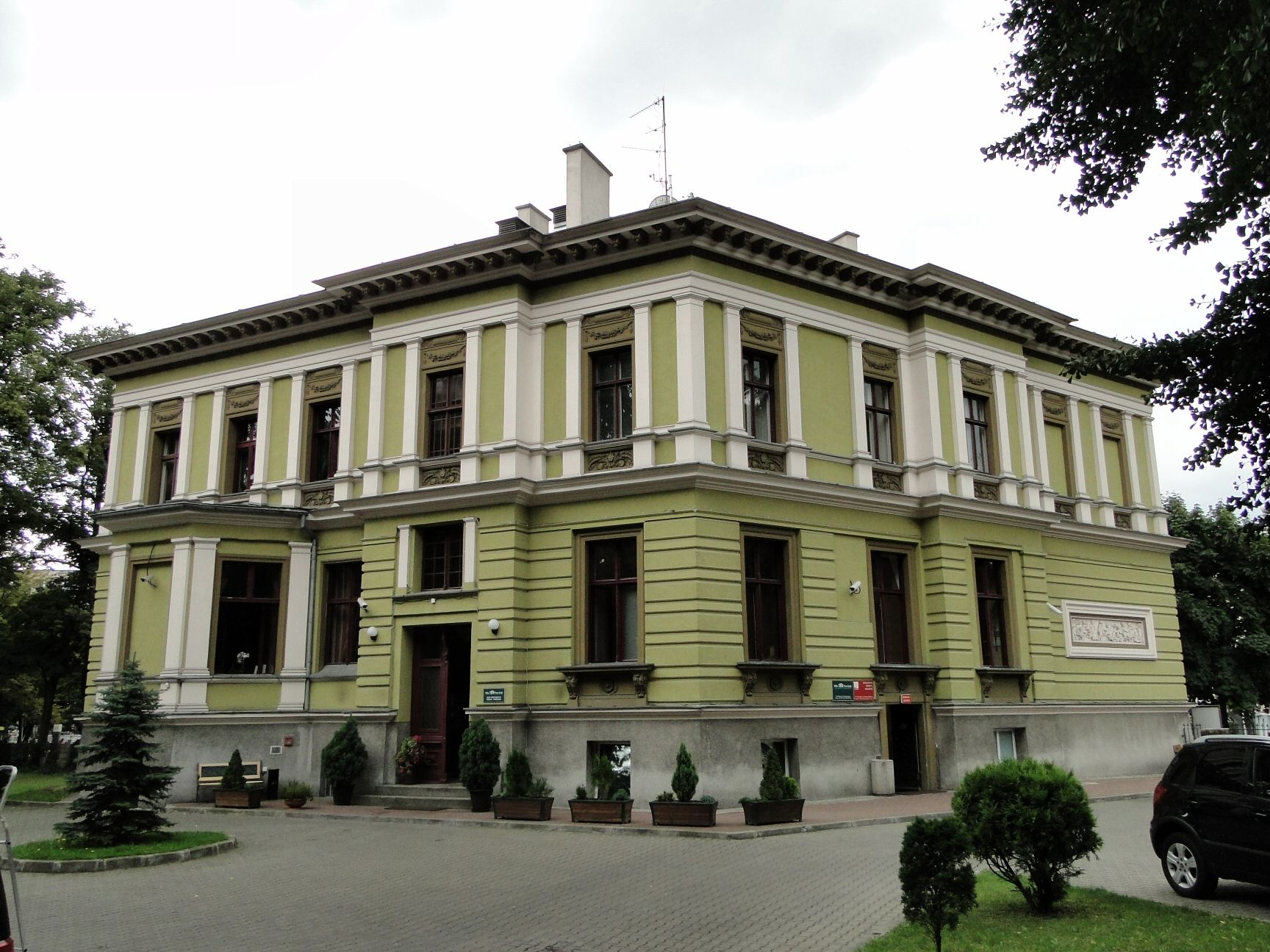
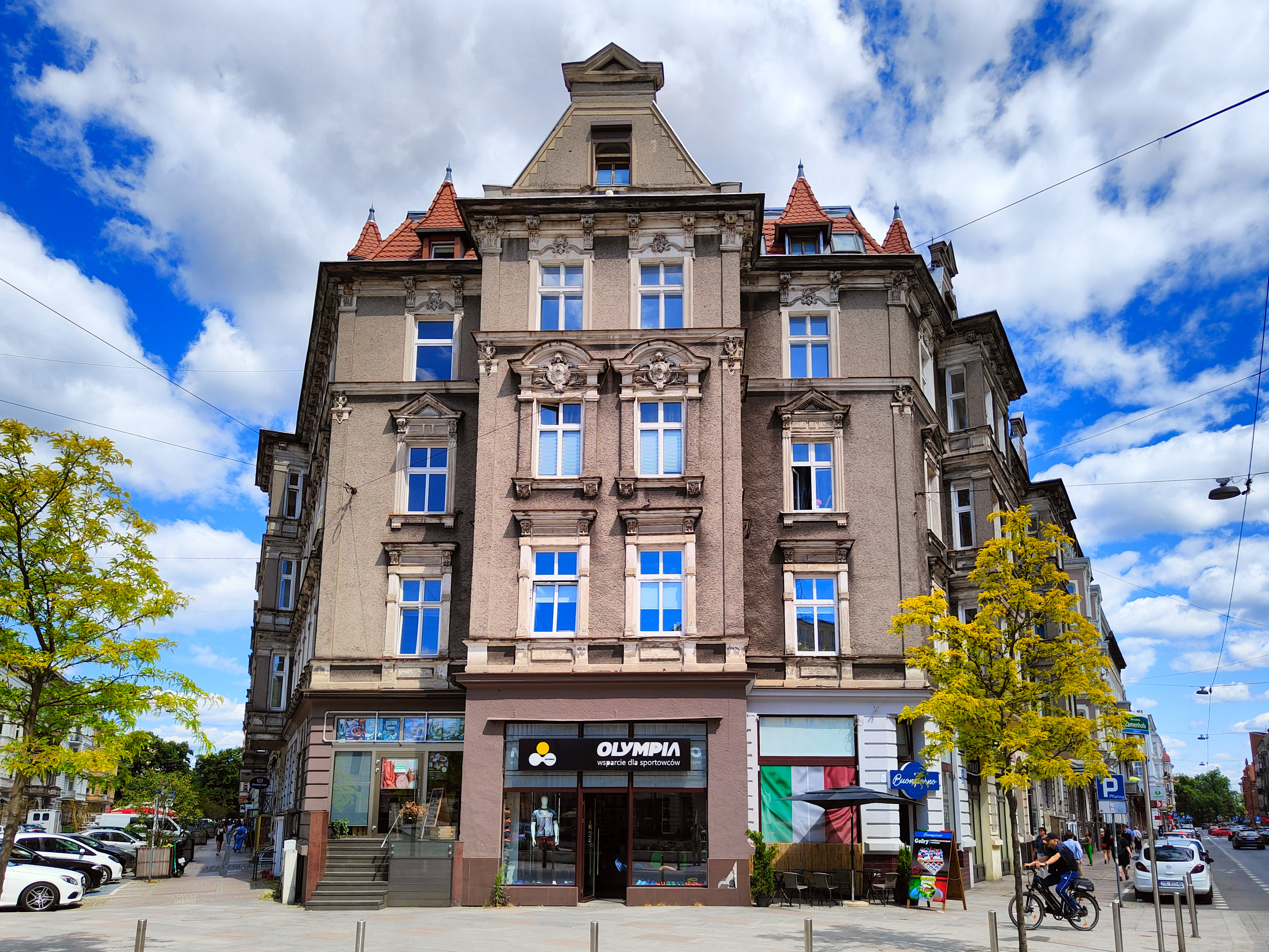
Honorary consulates of Italy and Lithuania

There are 15 honorary consulates in Szczecin, of Bosnia and Herzegovina, Cyprus, Czech Republic, Denmark, Estonia, Finland, France, Germany, Italy, Lithuania, Luxembourg, Moldova, Norway, Sweden and Ukraine.

== Notable persons ==
=== Miss International ===
Małgorzata Rożniecka, Miss International 2001

=== Twin towns and sister cities ===
Szczecin is twinned with:

- Bari, Italy
- Bremerhaven, Germany
- Dnipro, Ukraine
- Esbjerg, Denmark
- Friedrichshain-Kreuzberg (Berlin), Germany
- Greifswald, Germany
- Kingston upon Hull, United Kingdom
- Klaipėda, Lithuania
- Malmö, Sweden
- Rostock, Germany
- St. Louis, United States

== See also ==
- Towns near Szczecin: Stargard, Police, Gryfino, Goleniów, Pyrzyce, Cedynia, Chojna, Mieszkowice, Moryń, Trzcińsko-Zdrój, Nowe Warpno, Penkun (Germany), Pasewalk (Germany), Eggesin (Germany), Gartz (Germany)
- Villages near Szczecin: Kolbacz, Przęsocin, Kołbaskowo
- Szczecin Lagoon
- Międzyodrze-Wyspa Pucka
- Wkrzanska Forest
- Central Cemetery in Szczecin
- Ostrów Grabowski, an Oder river island in Szczecin
- Bystry Rów, a stream in Niebuszewo
- Gacek, a popular cat from Szczecin

== Bibliography ==
- Encyclopedia of Szczecin. Vol. I, A–O. Szczecin: University of Szczecin, 1999. ISBN 83-87341-45-2 (pl).
- Encyclopedia of Szczecin. Vol. II, P–Ż. Szczecin: University of Szczecin, 2000. ISBN 83-7241-089-5 (pl).
- Jan M. Piskorski, Bogdan Wachowiak, Edward Włodarczyk, A short history of Szczecin, Poznań, 2002. ISBN 83-7063-332-3 (pl).
- Petre, F. Loraine. Napoleon's Conquest of Prussia 1806. London: Lionel Leventhal Ltd., 1993 (1907). ISBN 1-85367-145-2.
- (in German) Jan Musekamp: Zwischen Stettin und Szczecin – Metamorphosen einer Stadt von 1945 bis 2001 (Between Stettin and Szczecin – a town's metamorphoses from 1945 to 2005). Wiesbaden, 2010 (restricted online preview), there is also a Polish edition Między Stettinem a Szczecinem. Metamorfoza miasta od 1945 do 2005.
- (in German) Martin Wehrmann: Geschichte der Stadt Stettin. Stettin, 1911 (reprinted in 1993 by Weltbild Verlag, Augsburg. ISBN 3-89350-119-3).
- (in German) W. H. Meyer: Stettin in alter und neuer Zeit (Stettin in ancient and modern times). Stettin, 1887.
- (in German) Gustav Kratz: Die Städte der Provinz Pommern – Abriss ihrer Geschichte, zumeist nach Urkunden (The towns of the province of Pomerania – Sketch of their history, mostly according to historical records). Berlin, 1865 (reprinted in 2010 by Kessinger Publishing, U.S.A., ISBN 1-161-12969-3), pp. 376–412 ( online).
- (in German) Fr. Thiede: Chronik der Stadt Stettin – Bearbeitet nach Urkunden und bewährtesten historischen Nachrichten (Chronicle of the town of Stettin – Worked out according to documents and reliable historical records). Stettin, 1849 (online). Szczecin International School is one of the only international schools in Poland.
- von Essen, Michael Fredholm (2019). Charles XI’s War: The Scanian War Between Sweden and Denmark, 1675-1679. Century of the Soldier. Helion & Company. ISBN 9781911628002.
