= The Bridges Forest =

Forest in Poland

Coordinates: 53.3407°N 14.5994°E

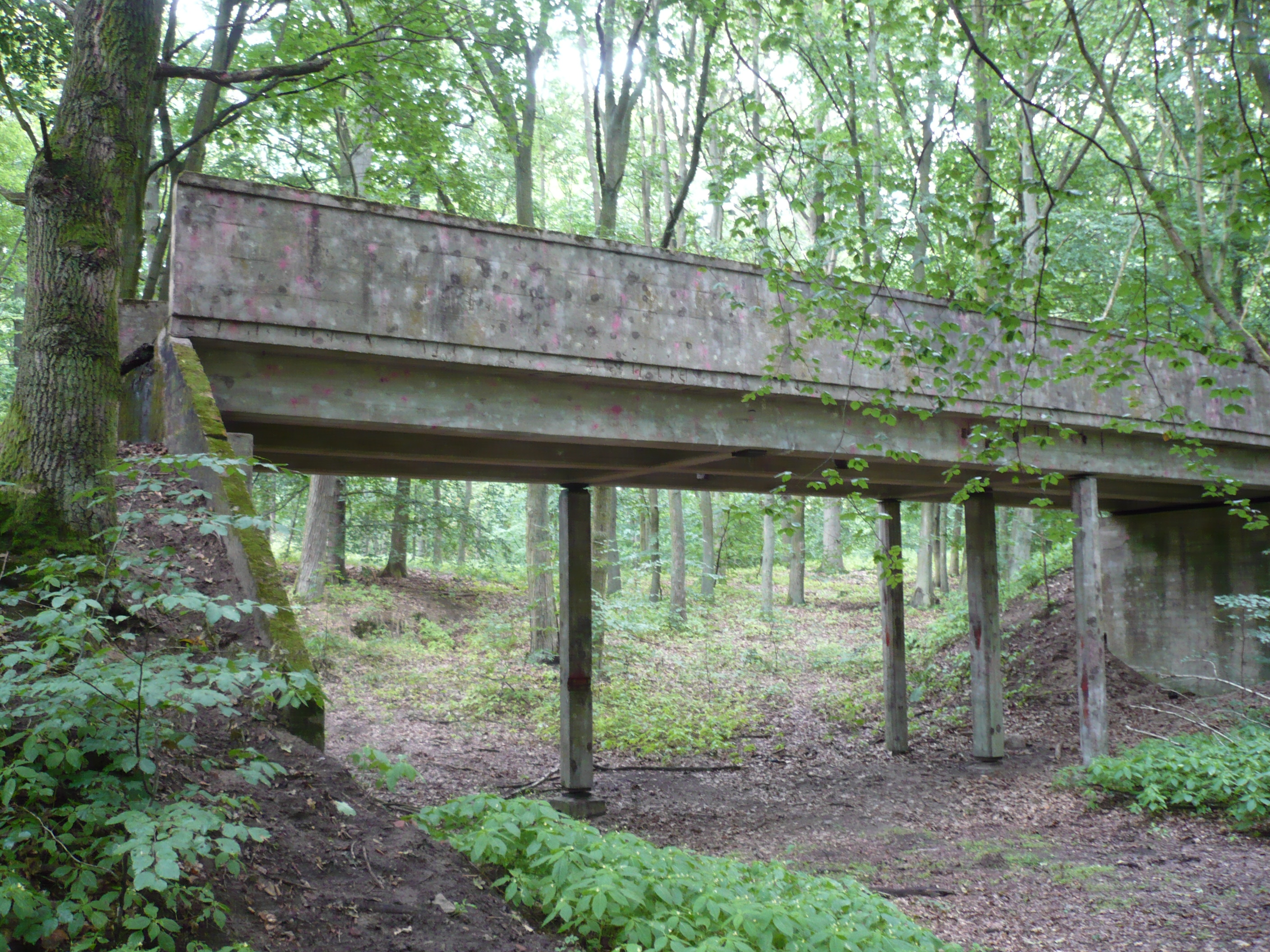
- The Thin Bridge, one of three concrete viaducts built in the forest in the 1930s, as part of the military training area for the sappers of the German Army.

- Location within Poland

Geography
- Location: Gryfino County, West Pomeranian Voivodeship, Poland

Administration
- Status: Forest

The Bridges Forest (Polish: Uroczysko Mosty) is a forest located in Gryfino County within West Pomeranian Voivodeship, Poland, placed to the east of the city of Szczecin. It forms a part of the Oak Heath, and is located within the municipality of Stare Czarnowo. The area includes three concrete viaducts, which were constructed in the 1930s, as part of the military training area for the sappers of the German Army.

== History ==
In the 1930s, the area of the Oak Heath to the south east of the villages of Klucz, Żydowce, and Podjuchy was used as a military training area of the German Army and the Protection Squadron. It was used to train sappers. Three concrete viaduct were constructed in the forest, for the soldiers to practice on.

During the Second World War, a labour camp was operated in the forest. It housed the woman textile workers from Łódź and Pabianice in occupied Poland, who were forced to work in a textile mill in Żydowce.

The area of the forest was incorporated into the city of Szczecin on 15 October 1939. During the Second World War, the city was captured by the Red Army of the Soviet Union on 26 April 1945. It was placed under the Polish administration on 5 July 1945, with its suburbs, which included the forest, being moved outside the city boundaries.

== Characteristics ==
The Bridges Forest is part of the Oak Heath, and includes species of trees such as beech, oak, and pine. The area includes three concrete viaducts, which were constructed in the 1930s, as part of the military training area for the sappers of the German Army. They are known as the Thin Bridge (Polish: Most Chudy), the Hunchbacked Bridge (Polish: Most Garbaty), and the Fat Bridge (Polish: Most Gruby). The forest also includes ruins of a forced labour camp, which operated within the forest during the Second World War.

The forest is located within the municipality of Stare Czarnowo in Gryfino County. To the northwest, it borders the city of Szczecin, with its neighbourhoods of Podjuchy and Żydowce-Klucz.

== Gallery ==
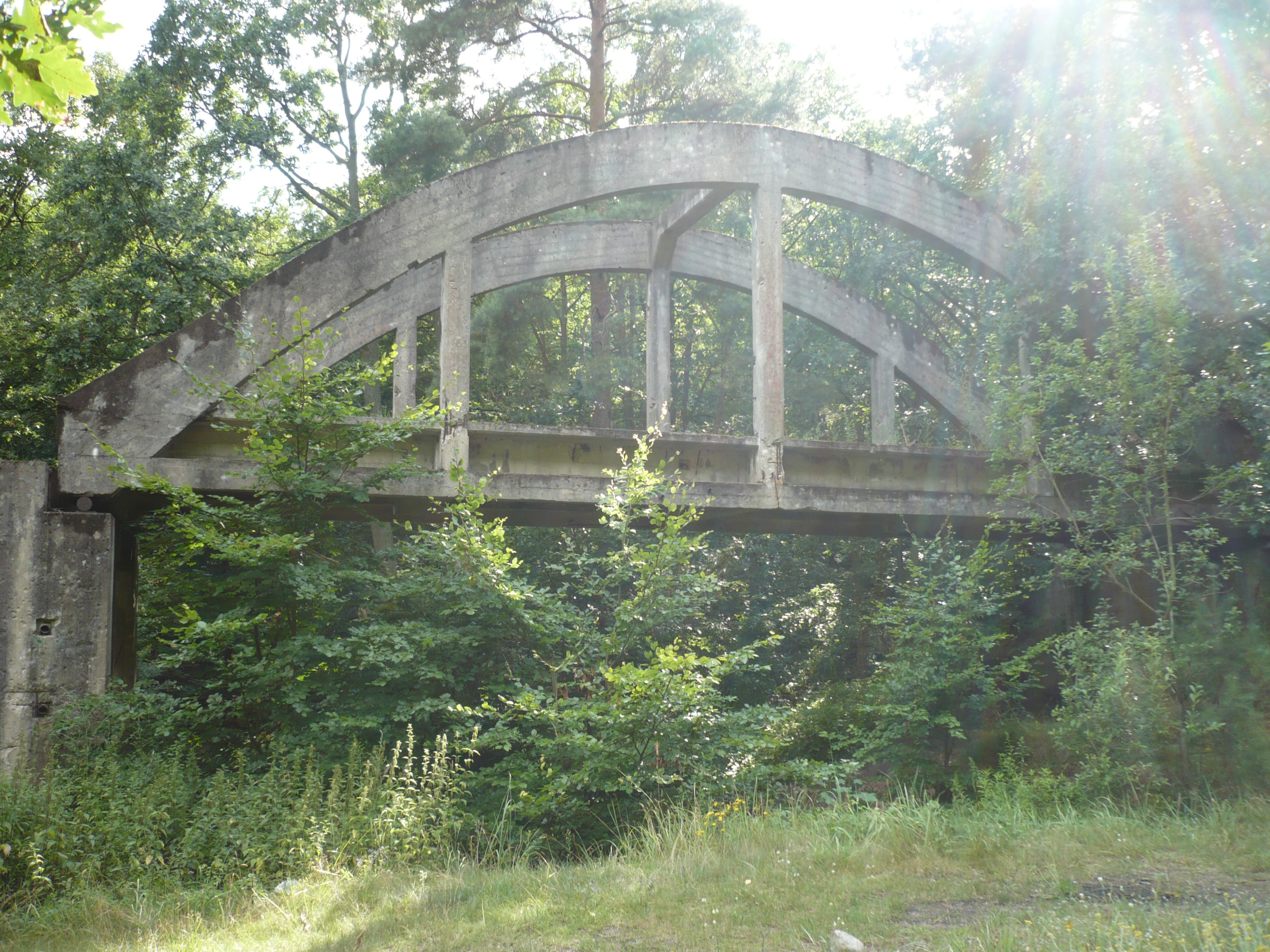
The Hunchbacked Bridge.

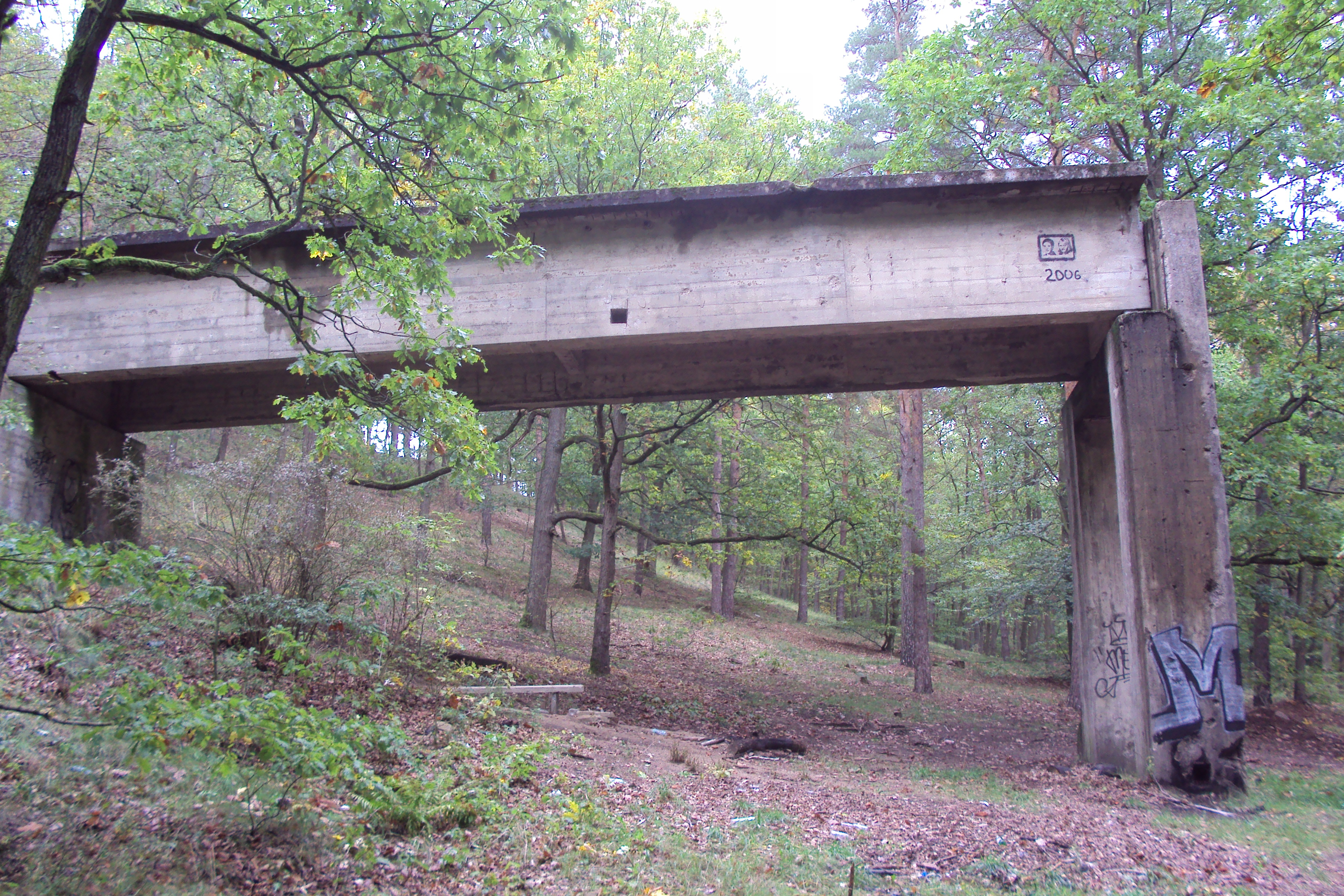
The Fat Bridge.
