= Timeline of Szczecin =

The following is a timeline of the history of the city of Szczecin, Poland.

== Prior to 16th century ==
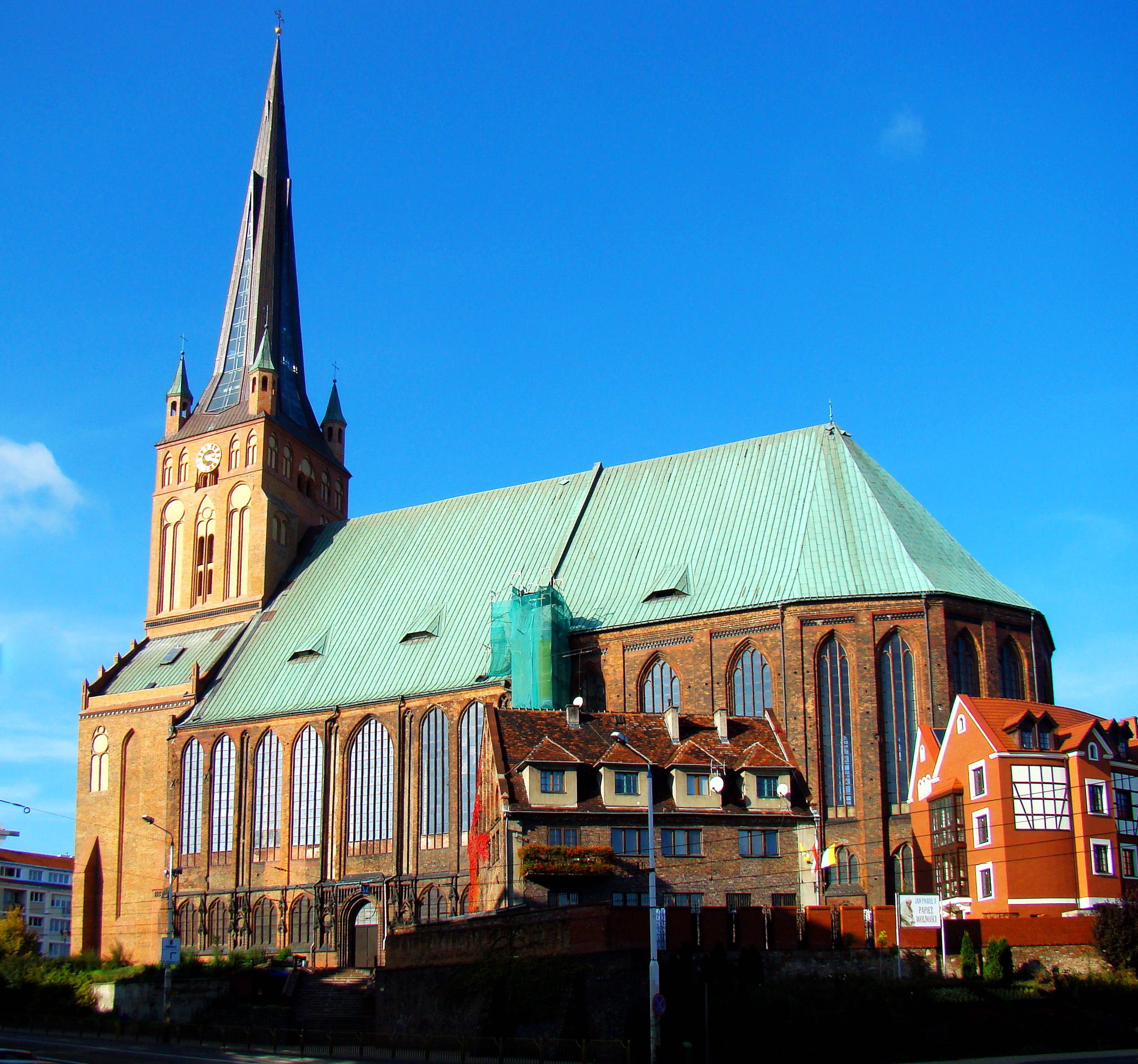
Gothic Szczecin Cathedral

- 967 - Szczecin became part of Poland under Mieszko I of Poland.
- 1121 - Bolesław III Wrymouth in power.
- 1124 - Saints Peter and Paul Church founded.
- ca. 1185 - Ducal mint founded.
- 1186 - Stay of the future Polish monarch Władysław III Spindleshanks at the court of Bogusław I, Duke of Pomerania in Szczecin, on behalf of his father, Duke of Greater Poland (and periodically also High Duke of Poland) Mieszko III the Old.
- 1243 - Szczecin granted Magdeburg city rights by Duke Barnim I the Good.
- 1273 - Wedding of duke of Poznań and future King of Poland Przemysł II with princess Ludgarda, granddaughter of Barnim I, Duke of Pomerania.
- 1275 - The city's inhabitants granted the right of free movement in the Principality of Rügen by Slavic Duke of Rügen Vitslav II.
- 1277 - The city purchases the villages, present-day districts, Krzekowo and Osów.
- 1278 - King Eric V of Denmark exempts the city's inhabitants from customs duties for a fair organised in Zealand, Denmark, along with a promise of peace and protection.
- 1284 - The city helps Duke Bogislaw IV to guarantee a peace treaty between the Duchy of Pomerania and the Margraviate of Brandenburg.
- 1295 - The city becomes capital of a splinter eponymous duchy under Otto I, and a residential city of Pomeranian dukes.
- 1360 - Szczecin becomes part of Hanseatic League.
- 1384 - Otto Jageteufel becomes mayor.
- 1478 - The city becomes the capital of the reunified Duchy of Pomerania.

== 16th to 19th centuries ==
- 1532 - The city becomes again the capital of a splinter eponymous duchy.
- ca. 1532 - Stoppage of minting coins in the local mint.
- 1535 - Protestant reformation.
- 1570 - Peace treaty, ending the Northern Seven Years' War between Denmark and Sweden signed in the city.
- 1577 - Printing press in operation.
- 1580 - Resumption of mint work.
- 1582 - Ducal Castle rebuilt.
- 1606 - Start of reign of Duke Philip II, the greatest patron of the arts among all Pomeranian dukes.
- 1625 - Under Bogislaw XIV the city becomes again the capital of the reunited Duchy of Pomerania.
- 1630 - Paul Friedeborn becomes mayor.
- 1637 - Death of Bogislaw XIV, the last Pomeranian duke of the House of Griffin.
- 1648 - City becomes part of Sweden.
- 1654 - Burial of Bogislaw XIV in the Ducal Castle.
- 1677 - City taken by Frederick William of Brandenburg.
- 1679 - Swedes in power again per Treaty of Saint-Germain-en-Laye.
- 1709 - Ducal mint closed down.
- 1711 - Stay of King Stanisław Leszczyński in the city.
- 1720 - City becomes part of Prussia.
- 1721
  - 6 June: French commune founded for the Huguenots, with separate French law and a separate French court.
  - 20 July: First French church service held at the castle.
- 1740 - Szczecin fortress built.
- 1806
  - October: Capitulation of Stettin without resistance to France.
  - City occupation by French forces begins.
- 1809 - French courthouse ceases to exist.
- 1813
  - Siege by combined Prussian-Russian-Swedish forces.
  - December - City occupation by French forces ends.
- 1827 - Royal Archives established.
- 1850 - Polish-language magazine Przyjaciel Chłopów begins publishing.
- 1851 - Schiffswerft und Maschinenfabrik Früchtenicht & Brock (shipbuilder) in business in nearby Drzetowo (then Bredow).
- 1870–1871 - Prussian prisoner-of-war camp for around 1,700 French soldiers located in the city during the Franco-Prussian War, death of around 600 French soldiers.
- 1871 - City becomes part of the German Empire.
- 1878 - Hermann Haken becomes mayor.
- 1885 - Population: 99,475.
- 1895 - Population: 140,724.
- 1898 - Harbour built.

== 20th century ==
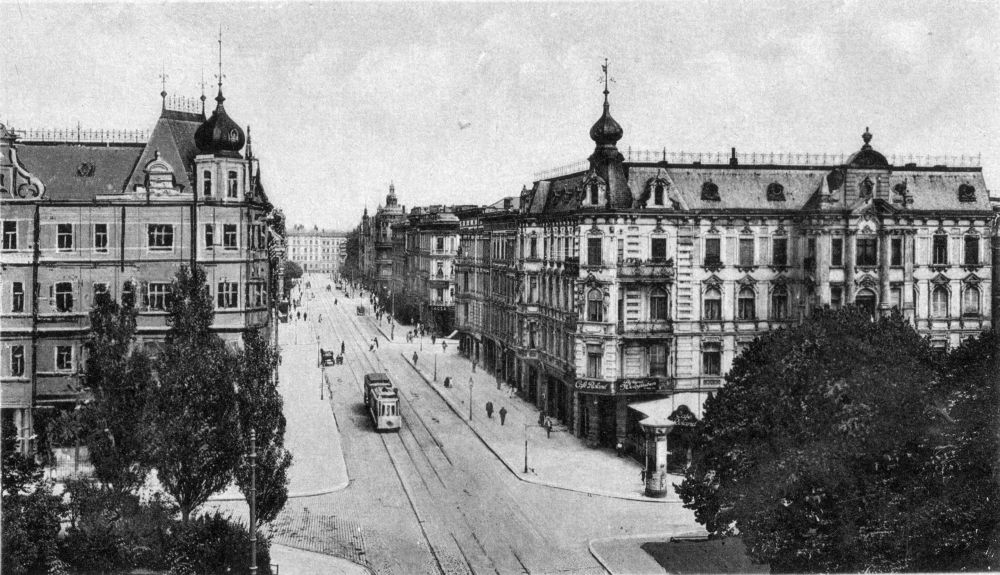
View of the city in the 1930s

- 1901 - Central Cemetery in Szczecin established.
- 1907 - Friedrich Ackermann becomes mayor.
- 1909 - Helios Kino (cinema) opens.
- 1911 - Pogodno and Świerczewo included within city limits.
- 1919 - Population: 232,726.
- 1925 - Consulate of the Republic of Poland opened.
- 1933 - Stettin-Bredow concentration camp established by Nazi Germany in Drzetowo.
- 1934
  - 15 February: Polish scout troop Gryf founded.
  - 9 March: Stettin-Bredow concentration camp dissolved.

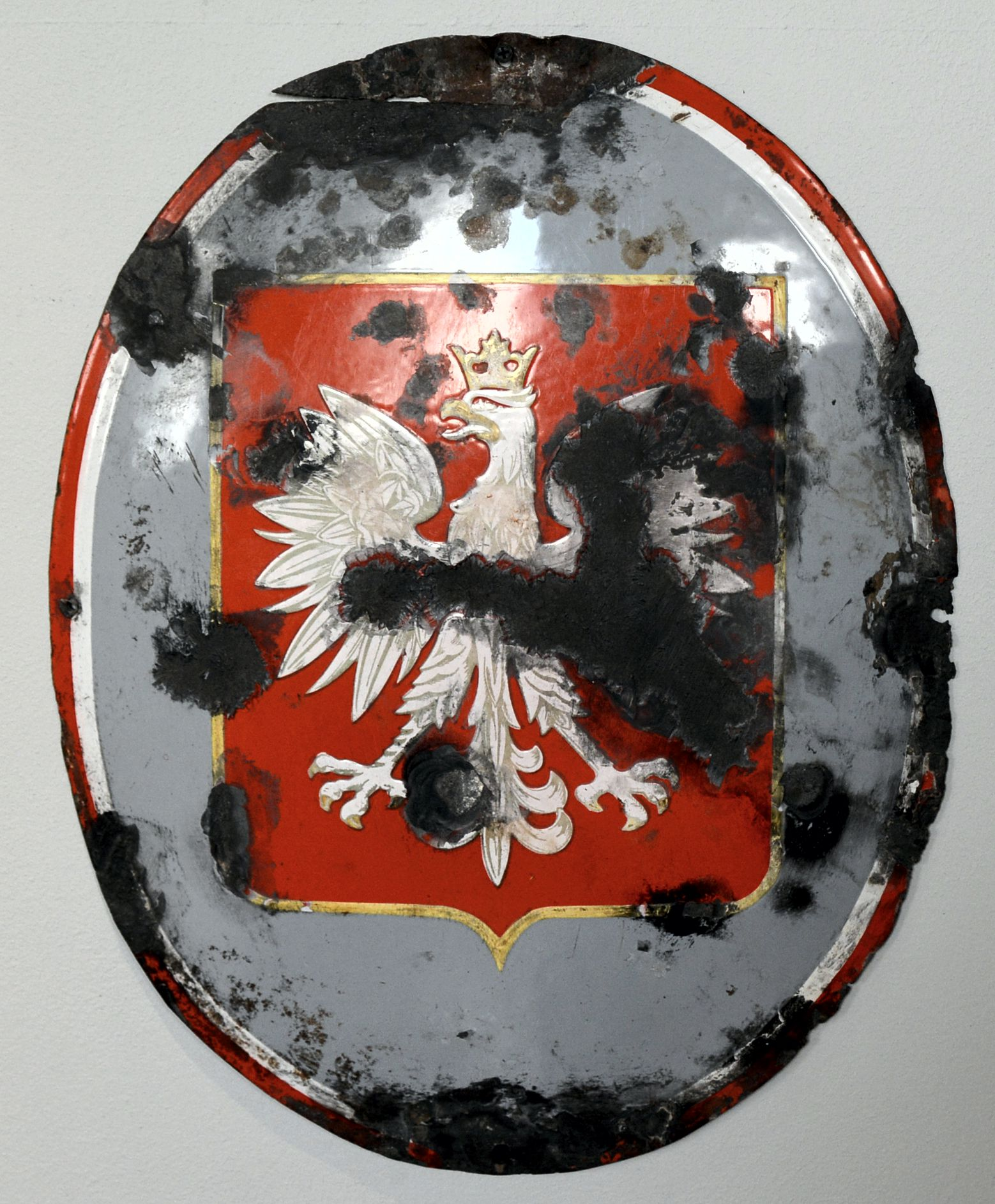
Emblem of the pre-war Polish Consulate, removed by the Germans in September 1939 and thrown into the Oder River; now an exhibit of the National Museum in Szczecin

- 1939
  - Population: 374,017.
  - Gemeinschaftslager Tiergarten forced labour camp established by the Germans.
- 1940
  - Bombing of Szczecin in World War II begins.
  - Merkurlager 4-Am Lenzweg forced labour camp established by the Germans.
- 1941
  - Stalag 322 prisoner-of-war camp briefly based in the city, but soon relocated.
  - Gemeinschaftslager Tiergarten forced labour camp dissolved.
- 1943 - September: Dulag transit camp for prisoners of war established by the Germans.
- 1943–1944 - The Polish resistance movement facilitated escapes of Polish and British prisoners of war who fled from German POW camps via the city's port to neutral Sweden.
- 1944 - Merkurlager 4-Am Lenzweg forced labour camp dissolved.
- 1945
  - 6–8 February: A German-organised march of some 6,000 Polish prisoners of war from the Oflag II-D camp passed through the present-day neighbourhoods of Śmierdnica and Żydowce.
  - May–June: Deutsche Zeitung (Stettin) newspaper published.
  - 5 July: City becomes again part of Poland.
  - Piotr Zaremba becomes mayor.
  - Szczecin Shipyard and National Museum in Szczecin established.

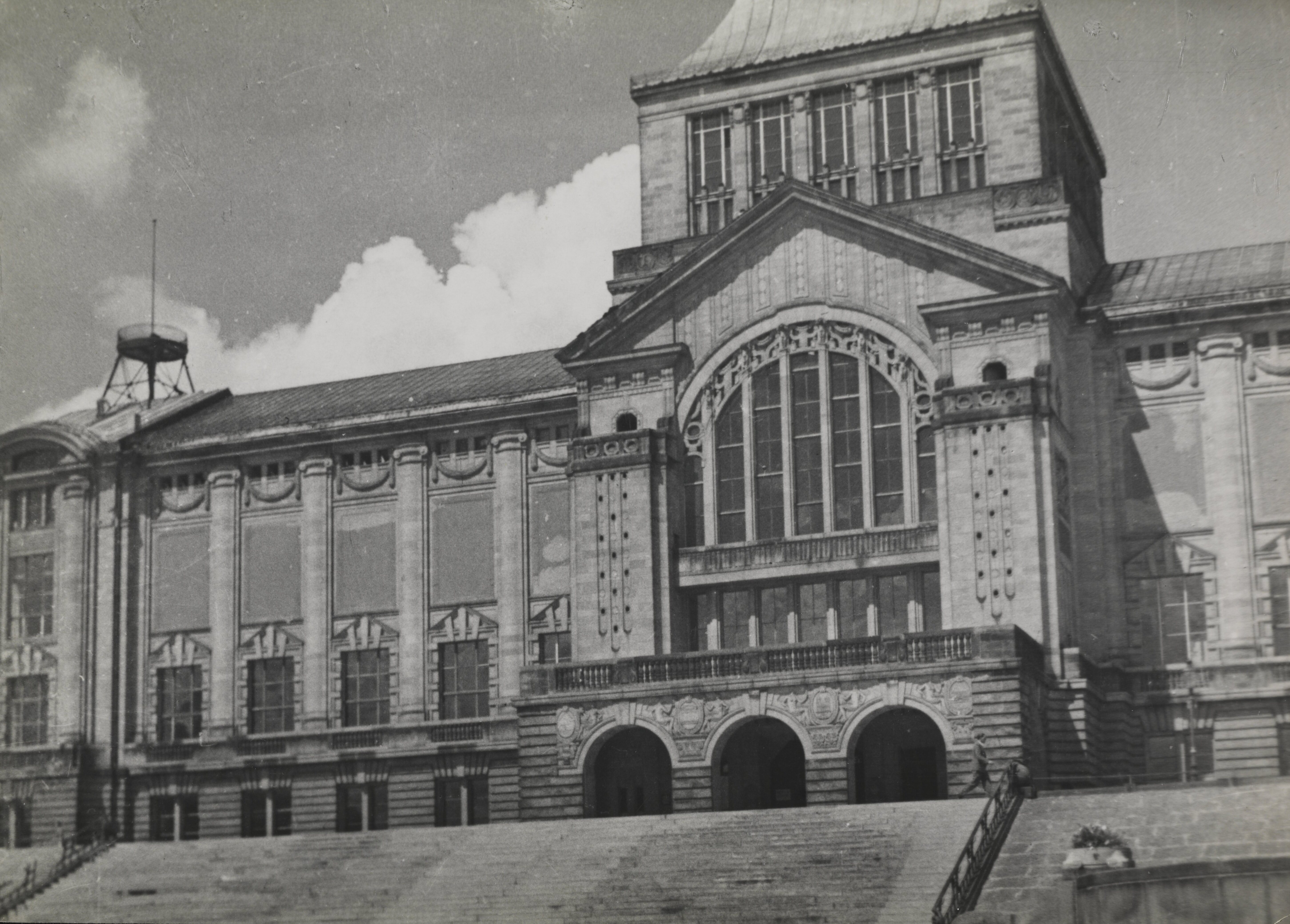
National Museum in Szczecin in 1949

- 1946
  - 12 May: Consulate of France opened.
  - Population: 72,948.
- 1947
  - 8 March: Polish-French Friendship Society founded.
  - 19 June: Głos Szczeciński newspaper begins publication.
- 1948
  - 21 April: Pogoń Szczecin, the city's most popular football club, founded.
  - 26 April: French Institute founded.
  - 25 October: Szczecin Philharmonic inaugurated.
- 1949 - Trzej Muszkieterowie (Three Musketeers) Polish anti-communist resistance organization founded.
- 1950 - Młodzi Patrioci (Young Patriots) Polish anti-communist resistance organization founded.
- 1951 - Harcerska Organizacja Podziemna (Underground Scout Organization) Polish anti-communist resistance organization founded.
- 1953 - Wola Polski (Polish Will) Polish anti-communist resistance organization founded.
- 1956
  - Mass raising of medical supplies and blood donation for the Hungarian Revolution of 1956 (see also Hungary–Poland relations).
  - 10 December: Protests against the Soviets and communist rule and in solidarity with Hungary. Protesters seized and demolished the Soviet consulate.
- 1962 - 9 October: 1962 Szczecin military parade debacle.
- 1965 - September: City co-hosts the 1965 FIVB Volleyball Men's World Cup.
- 1966 - Arkonia Szczecin wins its first Polish Water Polo Championship.
- 1970 - December: 1970 Polish protests.
- 1972
  - 1 January: Śmierdnica included within city limits.
  - 28 June: Roman Catholic diocese of Szczecin-Kamień established.
- 1974 - Population: 360,500.

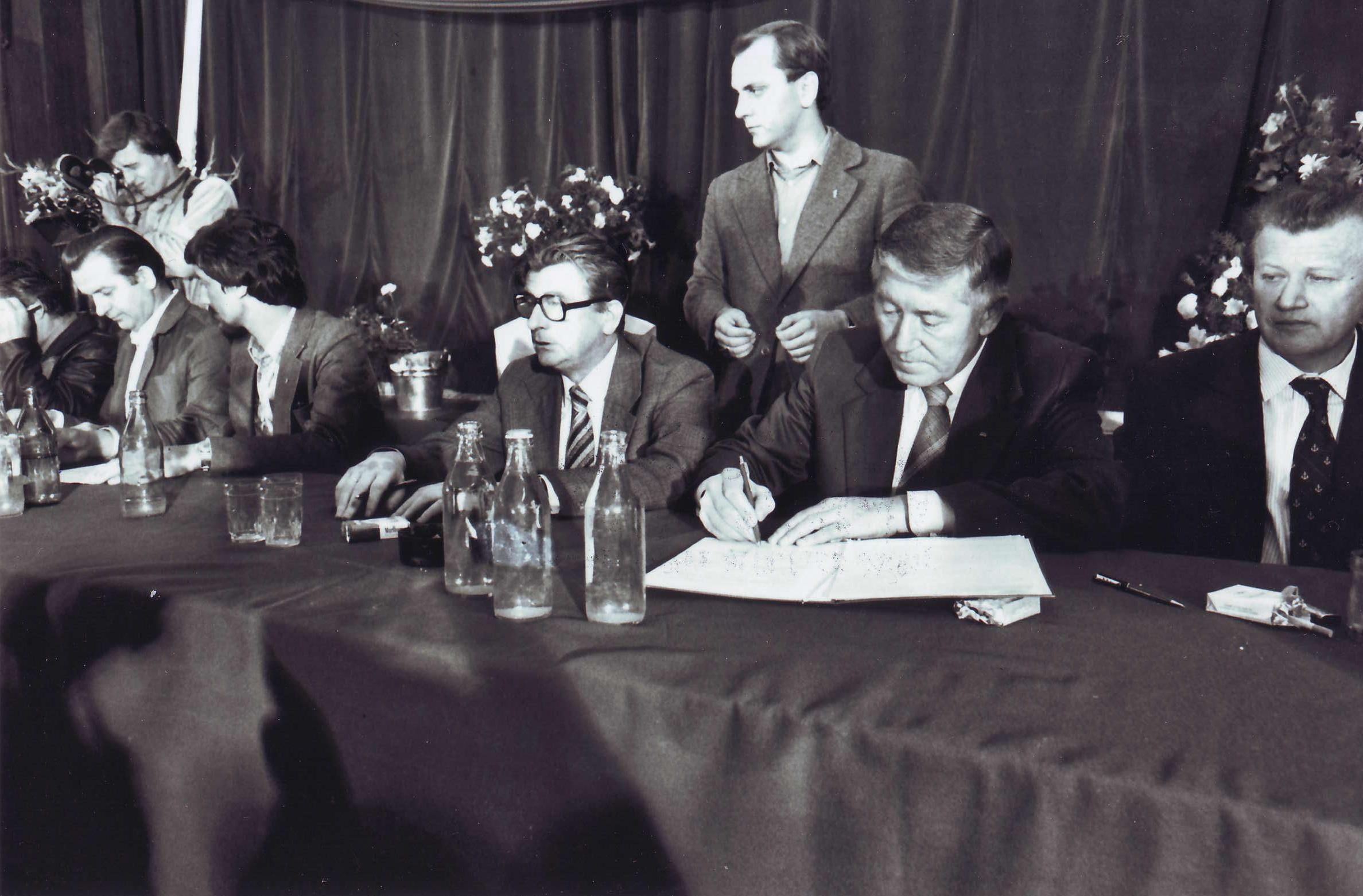
Signing of the Szczecin Agreement, 1980

- 1980
  - 18 August: The strike in Gdańsk and Gdynia expands to the Szczecin shipyards. Inter-Enterprise Strike Committee in Szczecin established.
  - 20 August: Workplaces in Świnoujście joined the Inter-Enterprise Strike Committee in Szczecin.
  - 26 August: First issue of Jedność ("Unity") strike newspaper published.
  - 30 August: Szczecin Agreement signed, strike ends.
- 1982 - August: Solidarity demonstration.
- 1983 - Pogoń Szczecin wins its first Polish women's handball championship.
- 1984 - University of Szczecin established.
- 1985 - Morze Bałtyk Szczecin wins its first Polish volleyball championship.
- 1987 - Visit of Pope John Paul II.
- 1988 - August: Labor strike.
- 1990 - Sister city partnership signed between Szczecin and Esbjerg, Denmark.
- 1992 - Sister city partnership signed between Szczecin and St. Louis, United States.

== 21st century ==
- 2001 - Stocznia Szczecińska Nowa (shipyard) active.
- 2002 - Honorary Consulate of Estonia opened (see also Estonia–Poland relations).
- 2006 - Piotr Krzystek becomes mayor.
- 2007 - Monument to the victims of Nazi German forced labour camps in the Pomorzany neighbourhood unveiled by one of its survivors, Florian Nowacki.
- 2011 - Szczecin hosts the 2011 European Short Course Swimming Championships.

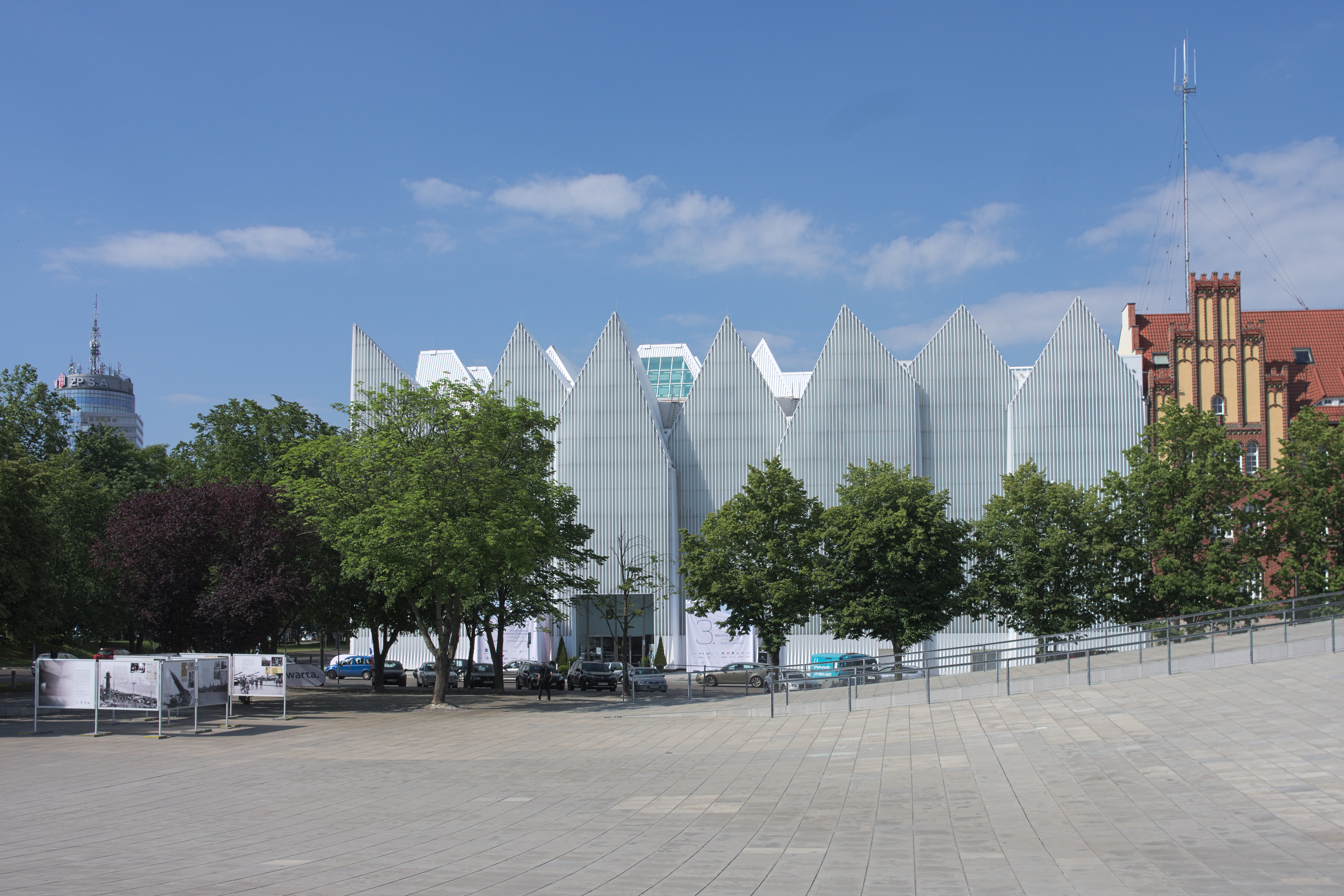
Szczecin Philharmonic

- 2012
  - Jan Czekanowski monument unveiled.
  - Population: 408,900.
- 2014 - Szczecin Philharmonic Hall built.
- 2016
  - 1 January: City limits slightly expanded by including a part of the village of Rzęśnica.
  - July: Monument to the victims of the Ponary massacre unveiled.
  - December: Hungarian-funded "Boy of Pest" monument unveiled to commemorate the gratitude of Hungarians for Polish support of the Hungarian Revolution of 1956.
- 2017 - Szczecin co-hosts the 2017 Men's European Volleyball Championship.
- 2018 - Lech Kaczyński monument unveiled.
- 2019
  - February: Monument to the victims of Massacres of Poles in Volhynia and Eastern Galicia unveiled.
  - April: Szczecin hosts the 2019 European Artistic Gymnastics Championships.
  - Monument of Wojtek, the Soldier Bear unveiled.
- 2021
  - September: Honorary Consulate of Luxembourg opened (see also Luxembourg–Poland relations).
  - 17 October: Jerzy Popiełuszko monument unveiled.
  - 27 October: Monument of Halina Pilawska, doctor and member of the Home Army during World War II, unveiled in the Pomorzany neighbourhood.
- 2024
  - June: Pogoń Szczecin wins its first Polish women's football championship.
  - December: Honorary Consulate of the Philippines opened (see also Philippines–Poland relations).

== See also ==
- History of Szczecin
- Etymology of Szczecin and Other names of Szczecin e.g. Stedyn, Stetin

== Bibliography ==
=== in English ===
- John Ramsay McCulloch (1877), "Stettin", in Hugh G. Reid (ed.), A Dictionary, Practical, Theoretical and Historical of Commerce and Commercial Navigation, London: Longmans, Green, and Co., hdl:2027/njp.32101079877088
- United States Department of State (1891). "Trade and Industries of Pomerania". Reports from the Consuls of the United States. Vol. 37. Washington DC: Government Printing Office. pp. 93 v. hdl:2027/uc1.$b474396 – via HathiTrust. (with details about Stettin)
- "Stettin", Chambers's Encyclopaedia, London: W. & R. Chambers, 1901, hdl:2027/uc2.ark:/13960/t7wm1k03v
- "Stettin", Northern Germany (15th ed.), Leipzig: Karl Baedeker, 1910, hdl:2027/mdp.39015042860240, OCLC 78390379 – via HathiTrust
- "Stettin", Encyclopædia Britannica (11th ed.), New York, 1910, OCLC 14782424 – via Internet Archive***Please note that a wikilink to the article on [Stettin] in [EB1911] is not available***
- Benjamin Vincent (1910), "Stettin", Haydn's Dictionary of Dates (25th ed.), London: Ward, Lock & Co., hdl:2027/loc.ark:/13960/t89g6g776

=== in other languages ===
- Paul Friedeborn [in German] (1613). Historische Beschreibung der Stadt Alten Stettin in Pommern [Historical Description of the Old City Stettin in Pomerania] (in German). Stettin: S. J. Rheten Erben.
- Stettin als handels- und industrieplatz [Stettin as commercial and industrial space] (in German). Stettin. 1906.
- P. Krauss; E. Uetrecht, eds. (1913). "Stettin". Meyers Deutscher Städteatlas [Meyer's Atlas of German Cities] (in German). Leipzig: Bibliographisches Institut.
- Kratz, Gustav (1865). Die Städte der Provinz Pommern. Abriss ihrer Geschichte, zumeist nach Urkunden. Berlin.
- Skrycki, Radosław (2011). "Z okresu wojny i pokoju – "francuskie" miejsca w Szczecinie z XVIII i XIX wieku". In Rembacka, Katarzyna (ed.). Szczecin i jego miejsca. Trzecia Konferencja Edukacyjna, 10 XII 2010 r. (in Polish). Szczecin. ISBN 978-83-61233-45-9.
