= K. Warner Schaie =

Klaus Warner Schaie (February 1, 1928 - February 7, 2023) was an American social gerontologist and psychologist best known for founding the Seattle Longitudinal Study in 1956.

The Seattle Longitudinal Study took a 'life span' approach to aging and cognition, studying subjects from birth through the life course. The aim was to filter out 'cohort effects' and other issues that come from studying mixed groups of people.

Schaie received numerous awards and honors, including the Kleemeier Award from the Gerontological Society of America, the Award for Distinguished Scientific Contributions from the American Psychological Association, and the Lifetime Career Award from the Mensa Research Foundation.

== Early life and education ==
K. Warner Schaie was born in 1928 in Stettin, which was then part of the Weimar Republic and now is part of Poland. He moved to California in 1947 and worked his way through undergraduate school using his skills as a printer. Schaie received his B.A. in psychology from the University of California, Berkeley in 1952. He then obtained his M.S. in psychology at the University of Washington, Seattle in 1953. Schaie finished his education at the University of Washington in 1956, earning a Ph.D. in psychology. In his early career, he studied the relationship between color and personality.

== Career ==
Schaie spent much of his career studying psychological development from young adulthood to old age. In 1986 he was a]ointed Evan Pugh Professor of Human Development and Psychology at Pennsylvania State University. He was later an Affiliate Professor of Psychiatry and Behavioral Sciences at the University of Washington. His research concerned developmental changes in adult intelligence, the impact of cognitive behavior in midlife and the integrity of brain structures in old age, and early detection of risk for dementia. Schaie also studied developmental research methodology in addition to the applications of the age-cohort-period model to psychology. Schaie was the author or editor of 60 books and 300 journal articles and chapters on the psychology of aging. Schaie was also known for his contributions to testing literature such as the Test of Behavioral Rigidity and the Schaie-Thurstone Test of Adult Mental Abilities.

== Contributions ==
Schaie is most well known for his leadership of the Seattle Longitudinal study. Its results challenged earlier models of cognitive aging. The research that Schaie conducted in the field of geropsychology also resulted in changes in public policy, such as raising the mandatory retirement ages from 65 to 70 in many fields.

== Death ==
Schaie died on Tuesday, February 7, 2023, in Seattle, at the age of 95.
