= Płonia-Śmierdnica-Jezierzyce =

- Municipal neighbourhood
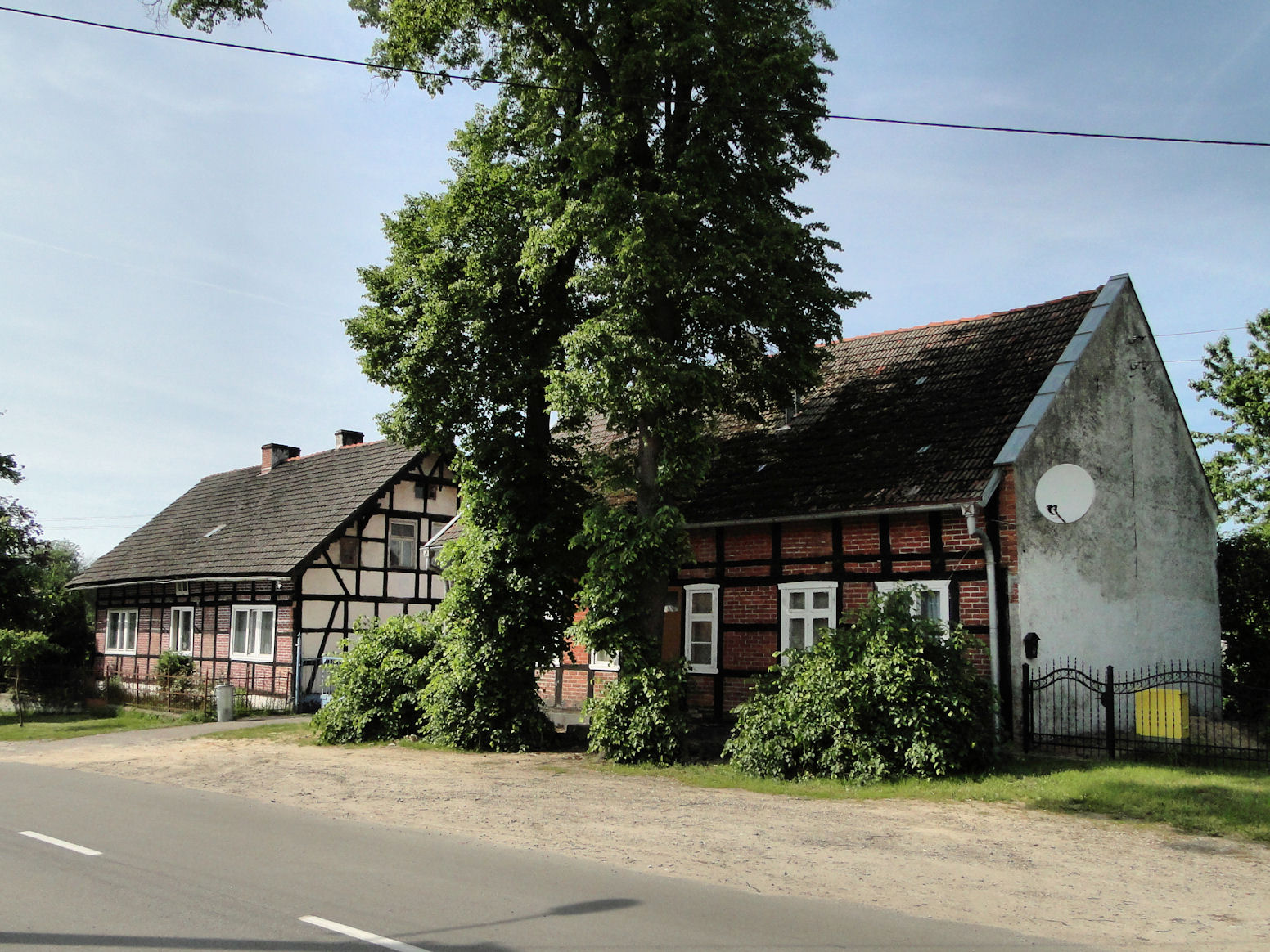
- Płonia-Śmierdnica-Jezierzyce

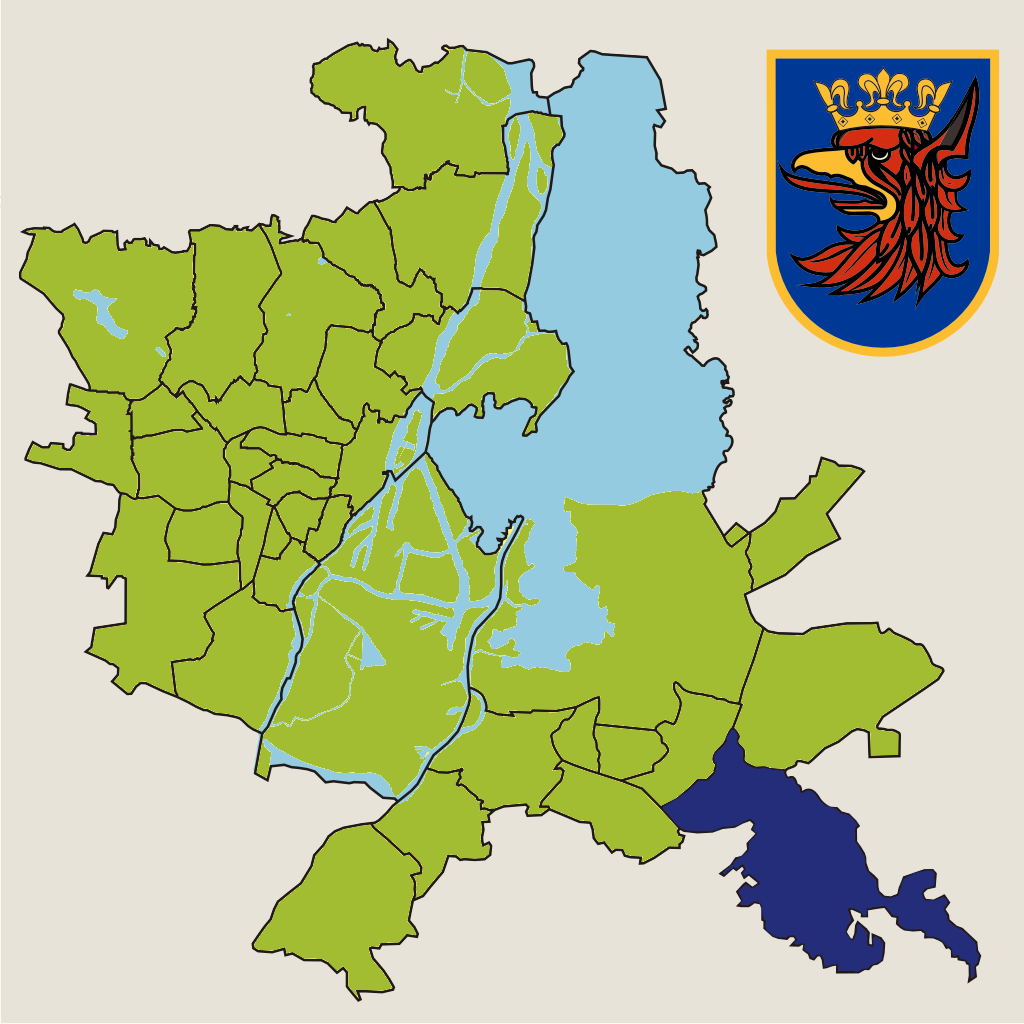
- Location of Płonia-Śmierdnica-Jezierzyce within Szczecin
- Coordinates: 53°21′21″N 14°44′12″E
- Country: Poland
- Voivodeship: West Pomeranian
- County/City: Szczecin

Population (2011)
  - Total: 3,933
- Time zone: UTC+1 (CET)
  - Summer (DST): UTC+2 (CEST)
- Area code: +48 91
- Car plates: ZS

Płonia-Śmierdnica-Jezierzyce is a municipal neighbourhood of the city of Szczecin, Poland, situated on the right bank of Oder river, south-east of the Szczecin Old Town, and Middle Town. As of January 2011 it had a population of 3,933.

Płonia-Śmierdnica-Jezierzyce comprises Płonia, Śmierdnica, and Jezierzyce.
