= Erich Wiesner =

German politician (1897–1968)

Erich Wiesner (17 April 1897 – 16 October 1968) was a German communist politician and last German Mayor of Stettin (today Szczecin).

== Biography ==
Wiesner was born in Weimar and worked as a bookprinter, he joined the Social Democratic Party of Germany in 1914 and the Communist Party of Germany (KPD) in 1919. He was drafted into the German Army in the First World War. Wiesner became a member of the Central committee of the Young Communist League of Germany in 1920 and moved to the Soviet Union in 1927, where he worked at the Comintern. Wiesner returned to Germany in 1930 and became a journalist at the communist newspaper "Volkswacht" in Stettin.

After the Nazis took over power in Germany in 1933 Wiesner worked in illegal underground and was arrested e.g. in the Emslandlager.

After the end of World War II Wiesner was appointed the mayor of Stettin on 26 May 1945 by Red Army authorities but was forced to leave office after the city was handed over to Poland on 5 July 1945. From August till December 1945 Wiesner was the mayor of Schwerin and later held several positions within the Communist party and the Socialist Unity Party of Germany (SED). He was the head of the district administration (Landrat) of Güstrow in 1950-52 and worked for the official newspaper of the SED (Schweriner Volkszeitung) in Schwerin in 1952-64.

Wiesner died in Schwerin.

== See also ==
- History of Szczecin
