= Jezierzyce, Szczecin =

Neighbourhood of Szczecin, Poland

Jezierzyce
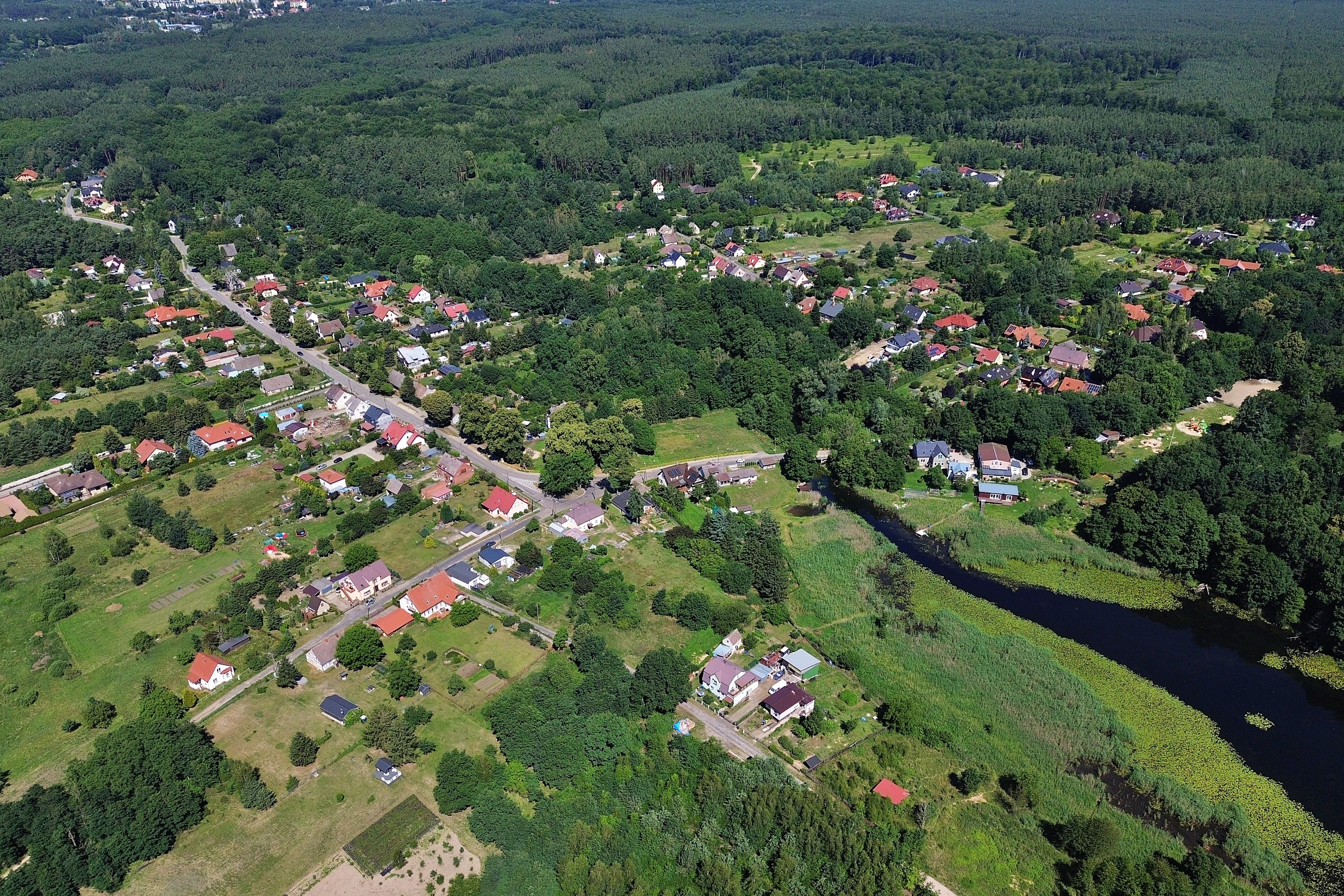
- Aerial view of Jezierzyce

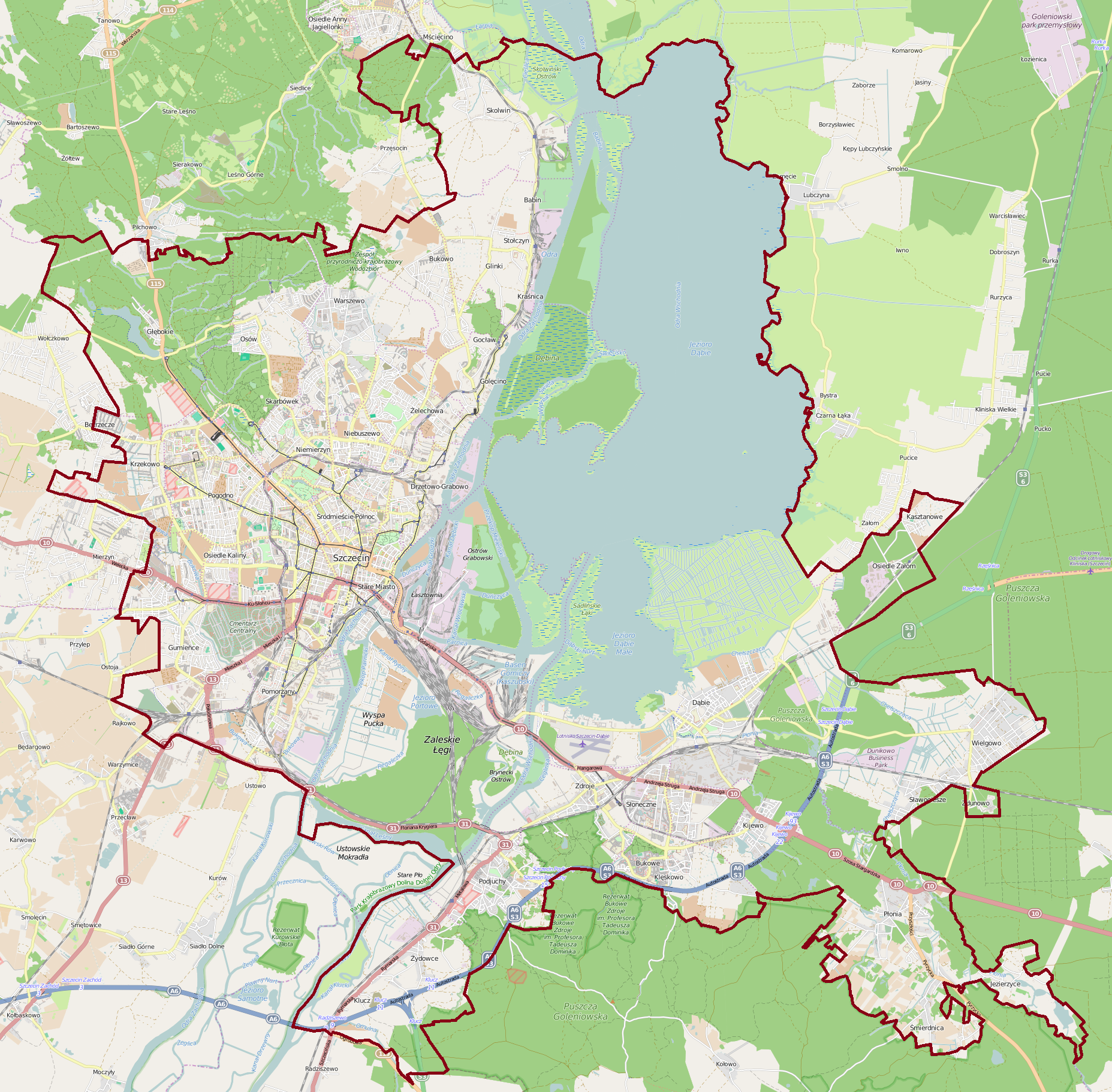
- Location within Szczecin Location within Poland
- Coordinates: 53.3405°N 14.7892°E
- Country: Poland
- Voivodeship: West Pomeranian
- County/City: Szczecin
- Neighbourhood: Płonia-Śmierdnica-Jezierzyce
- Within city limits: 1972
- Time zone: UTC+1 (CET)
  - Summer (DST): UTC+2 (CEST)
- Vehicle registration: ZS

Jezierzyce is a part of Szczecin, Poland, located in the south-eastern part of the city, on the right bank of Oder river.
