= Śmierdnica =

Neighbourhood of Szczecin, Poland

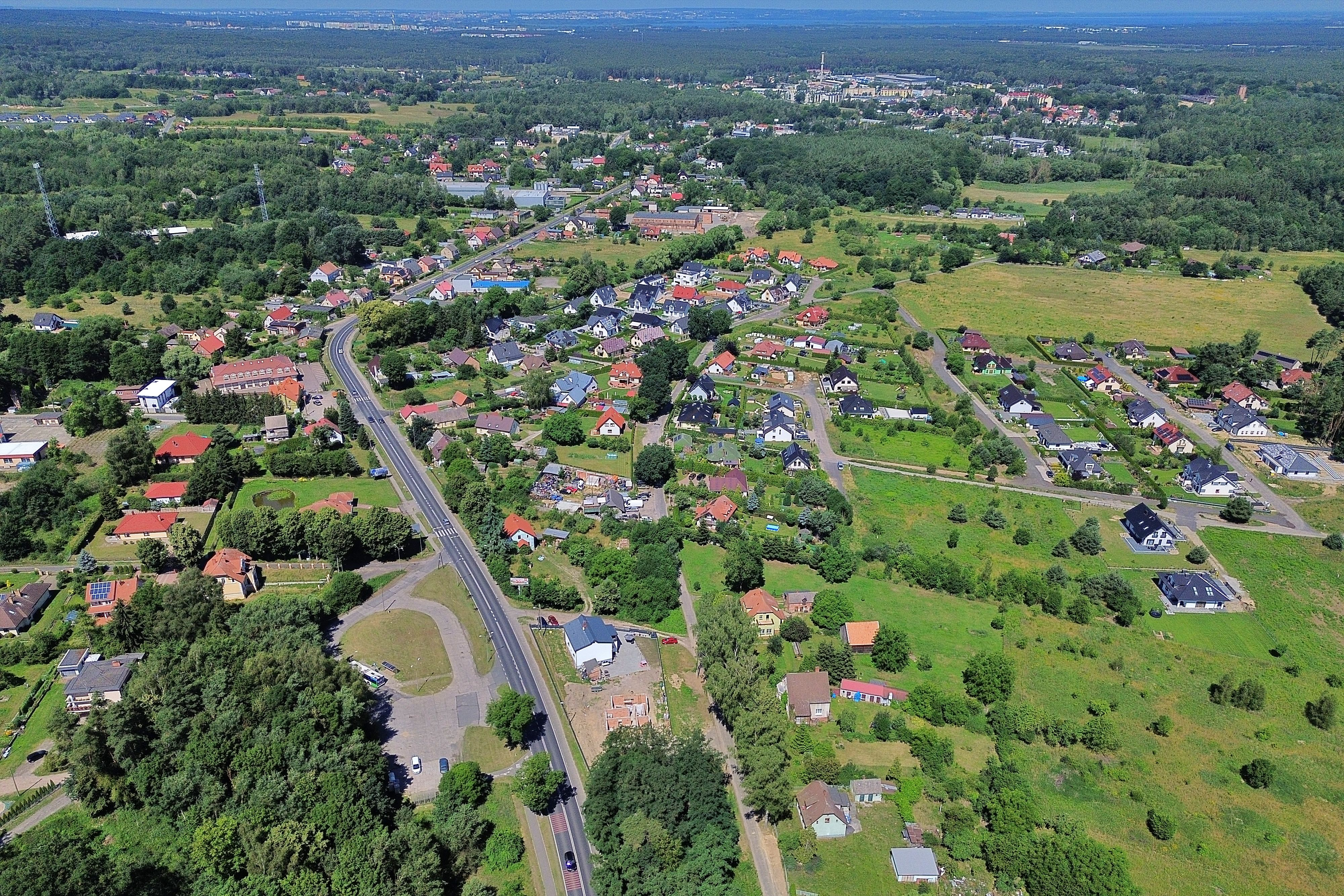
- Aerial view of Śmierdnica

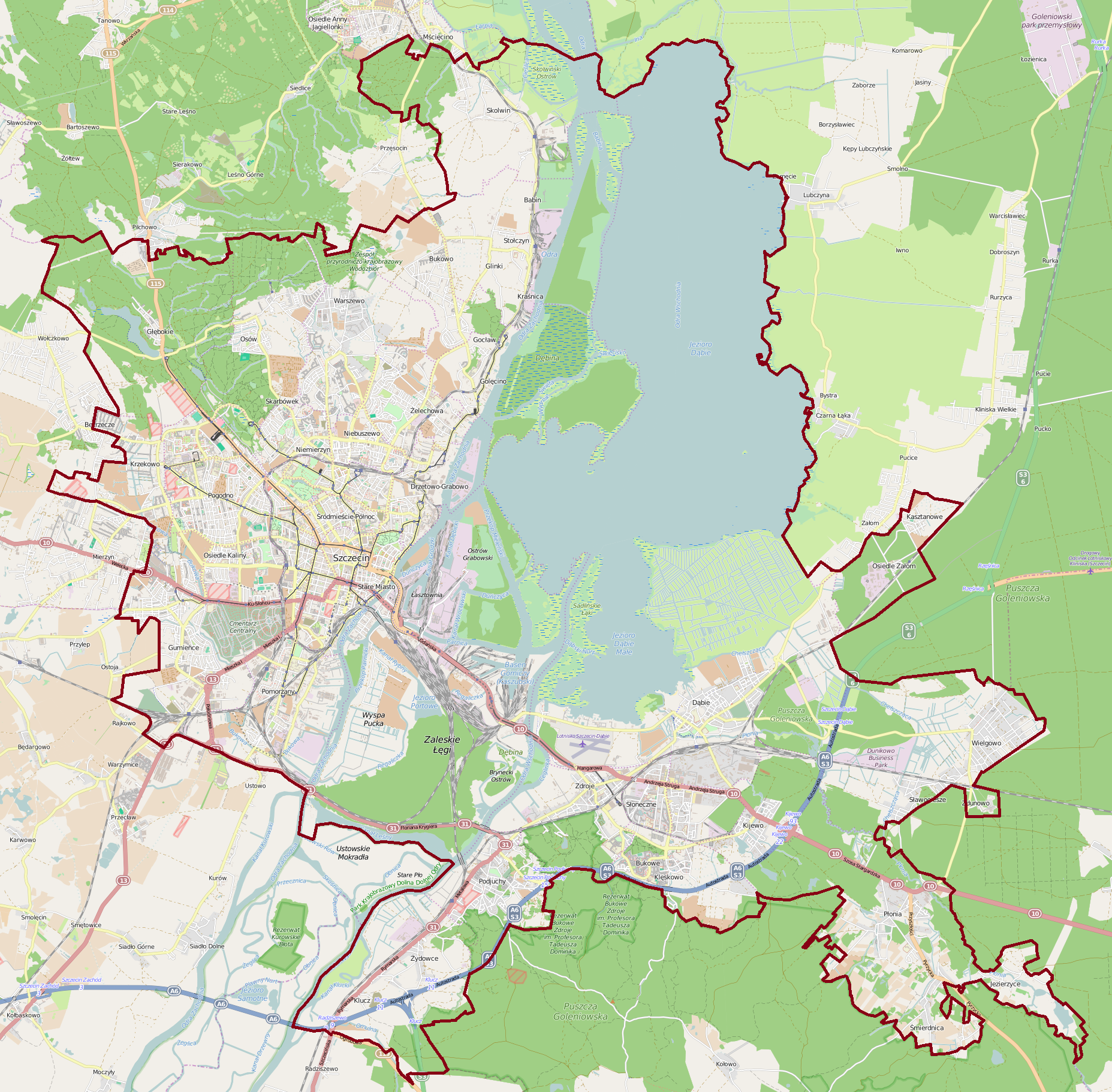
- Location within Szczecin Location within Poland
- Coordinates: 53°20′37″N 14°45′09″E
- Country: Poland
- Voivodeship: West Pomeranian
- County/City: Szczecin
- Neighbourhood: Płonia-Śmierdnica-Jezierzyce
- Within city limits: 1972
- Time zone: UTC+1 (CET)
  - Summer (DST): UTC+2 (CEST)
- Vehicle registration: ZS
- Primary airport: Solidarity Szczecin–Goleniów Airport

Śmierdnica is a part of Szczecin, Poland, located in the south-eastern part of the city, on the right bank of Oder river.

During World War II, on 6 February 1945, it was the site of a stopover during the German-organised march of some 6,000 Polish prisoners of war from the Oflag II-D camp headed westwards.
