= Klucz, Szczecin =

Neighbourhood of Szczecin, Poland

Klucz
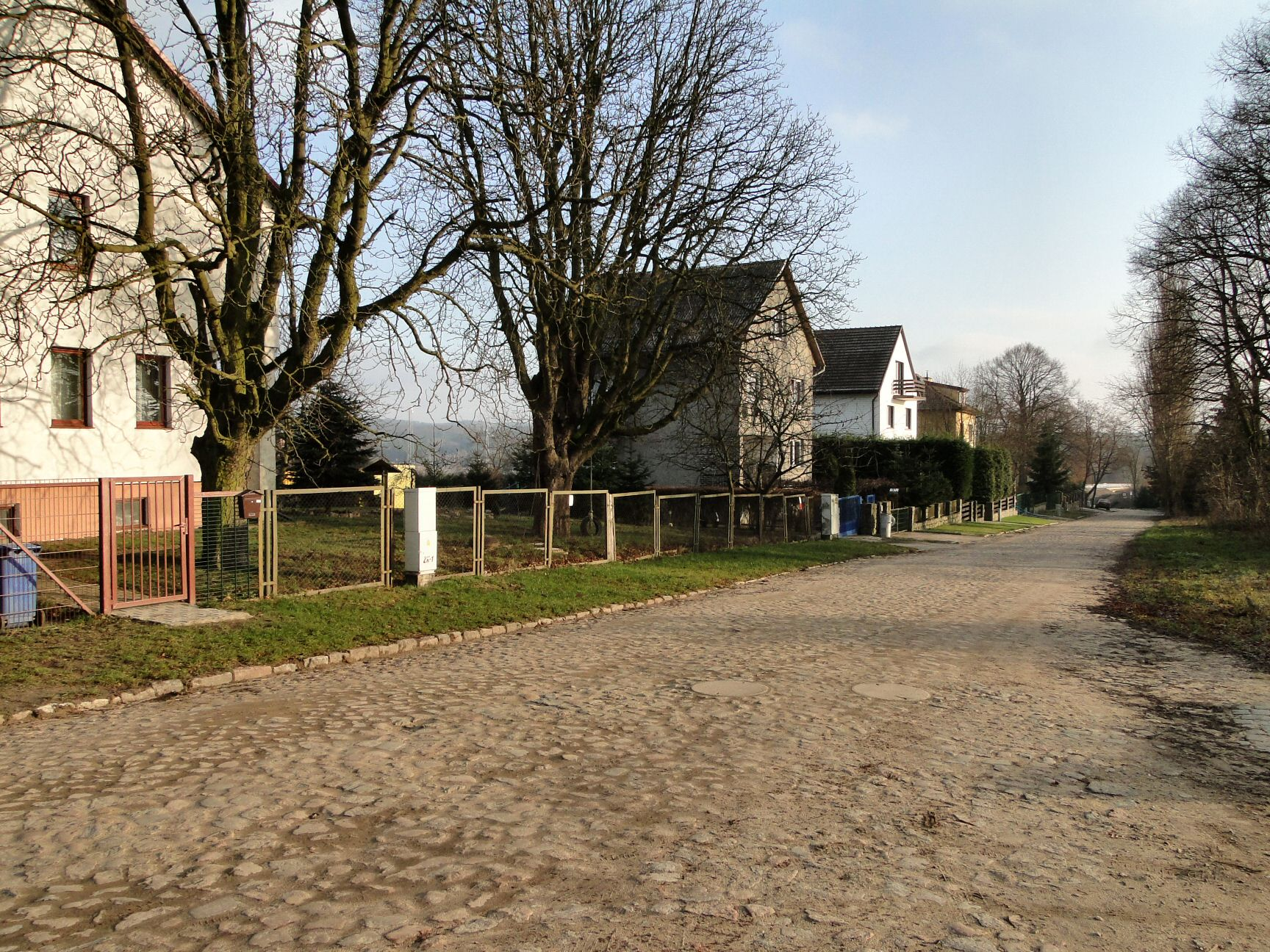
- Bielańska Street

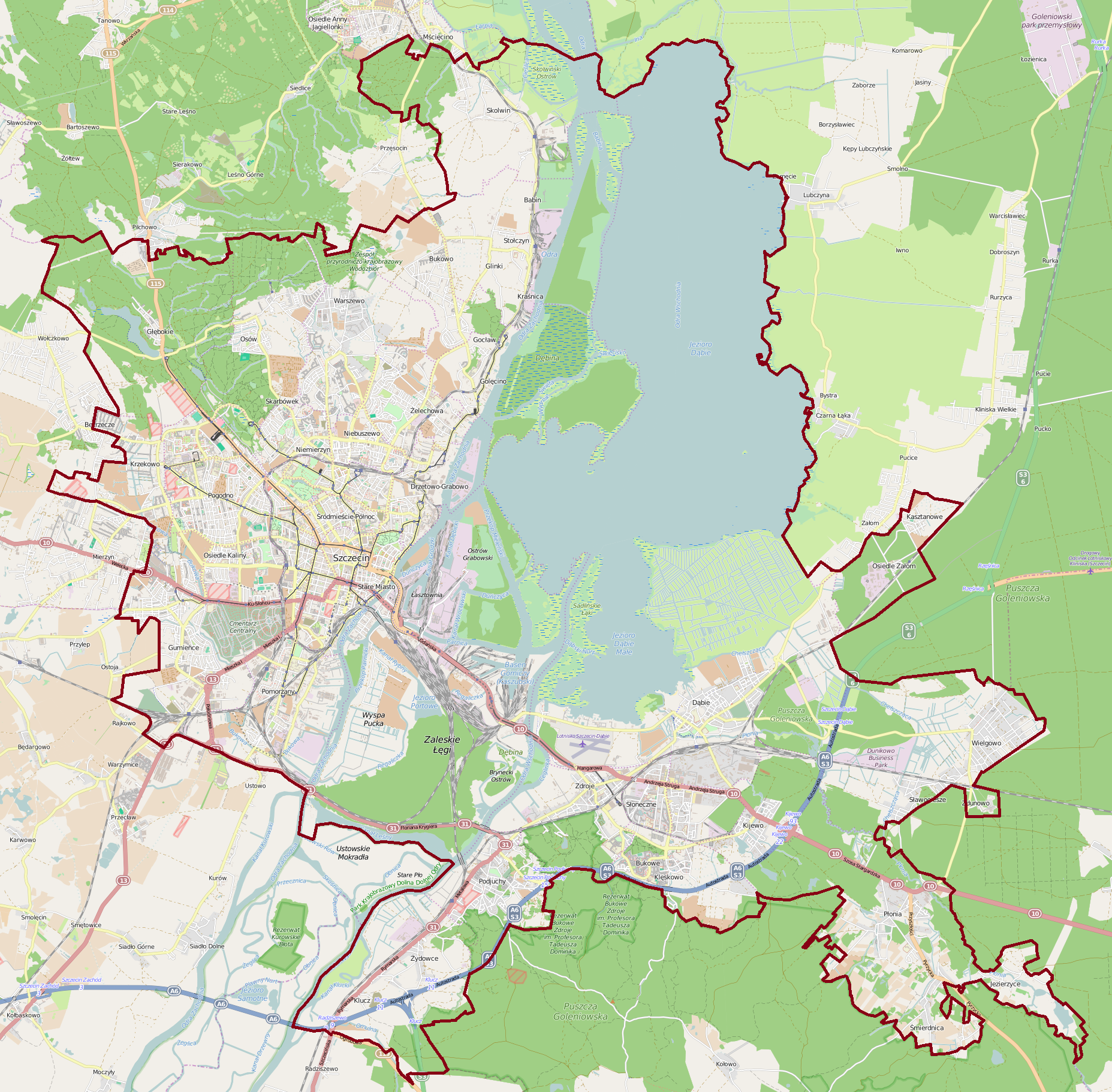
- Location within Szczecin Location within Poland
- Coordinates: 53.3407°N 14.5622°E
- Country: Poland
- Voivodeship: West Pomeranian
- County/City: Szczecin
- Neighbourhood: Żydowce-Klucz
- Time zone: UTC+1 (CET)
  - Summer (DST): UTC+2 (CEST)
- Vehicle registration: ZS

Klucz is a part of the city of Szczecin, Poland, situated on the right bank of Oder river, in the southern part of the city.

The area became part of the emerging Duchy of Poland under its first ruler Mieszko I around 967, and following Poland's fragmentation in 1138, it formed part of the Duchy of Pomerania. During the Thirty Years' War, the settlement fell to the Swedish Empire. Later on, it passed to Prussia, and from 1871 to 1945 it was part of Germany, within which it was known as Klütz. In 1945, the area became part of Poland.
