= Żydowce-Klucz =

- Municipal neighbourhood
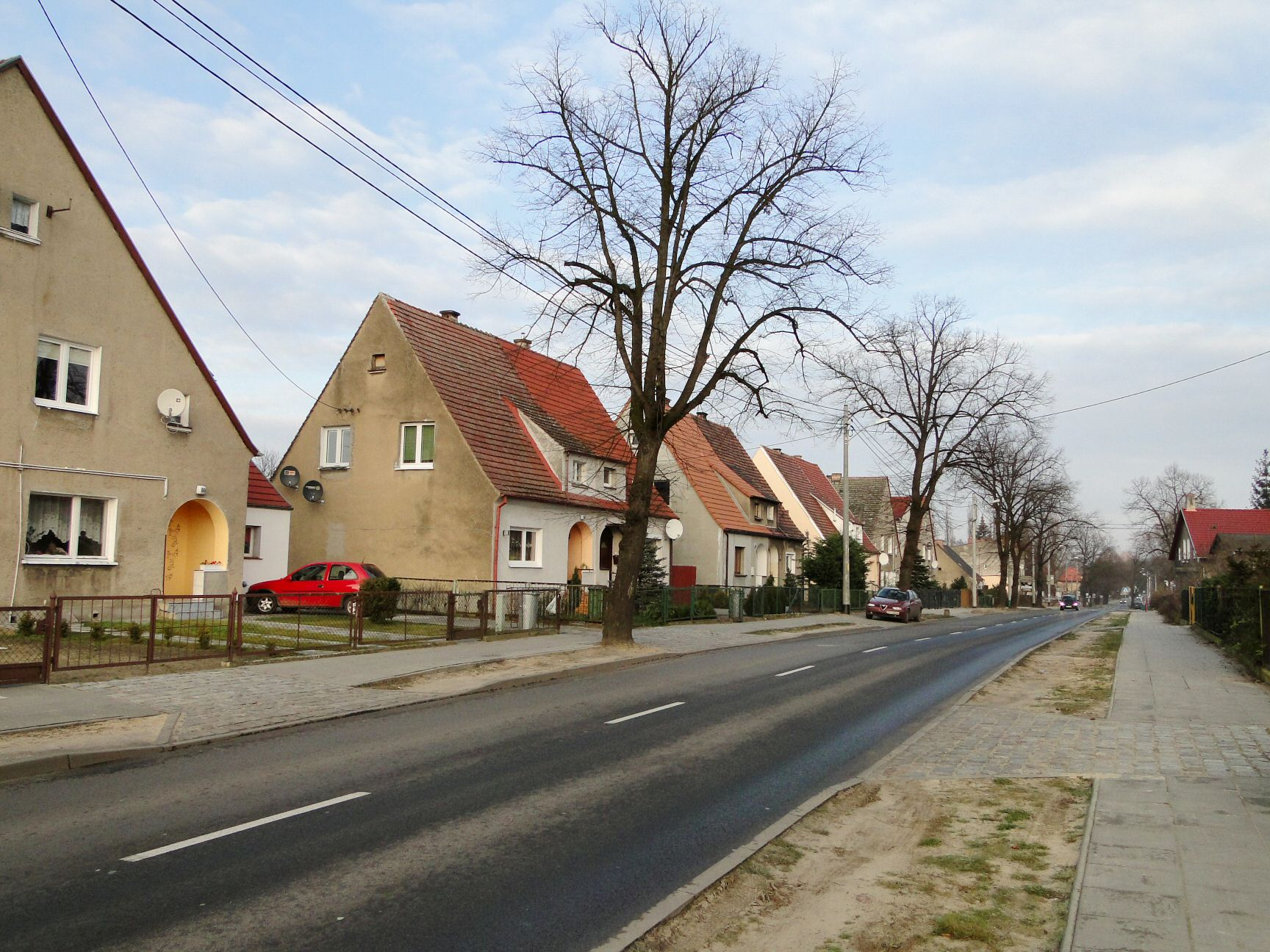
- Buildings in Żydowce

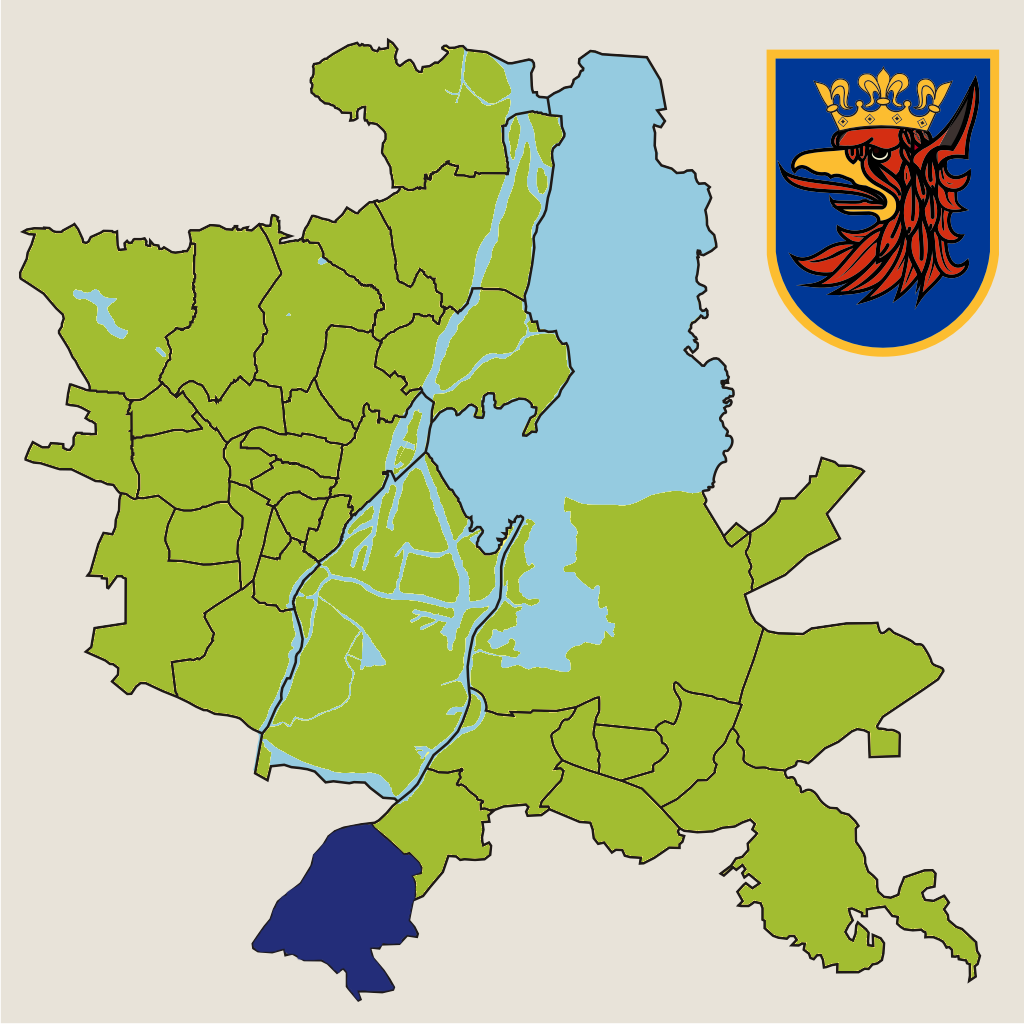
- Location of Żydowce-Klucz within Szczecin
- Coordinates: 53°21′12″N 14°34′22″E
- Country: Poland
- Voivodeship: West Pomeranian
- County/City: Szczecin

Population (2011)
  - Total: 2,450
- Time zone: UTC+1 (CET)
  - Summer (DST): UTC+2 (CEST)
- Area code: +48 91
- Car plates: ZS

Żydowce-Klucz is a municipal neighbourhood of the city of Szczecin, Poland situated on the right bank of Oder river, south-east of the Szczecin Old Town, and Middle Town. As of January 2011 it had a population of 2,450.

Żydowce-Klucz comprises Żydowce and Klucz.
