= Żydowce =

Neighbourhood of Szczecin, Poland

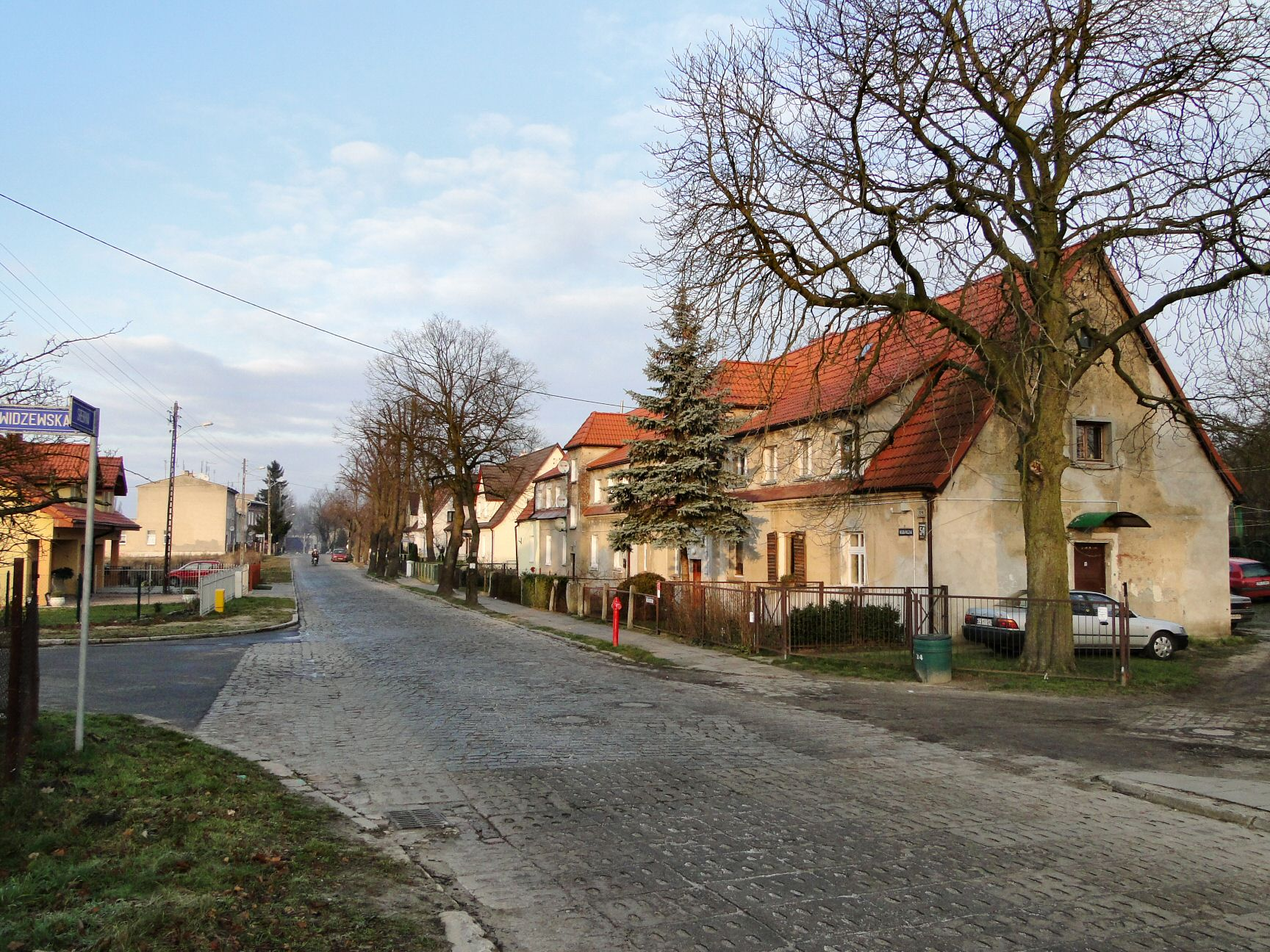
- Mechaniczna Street

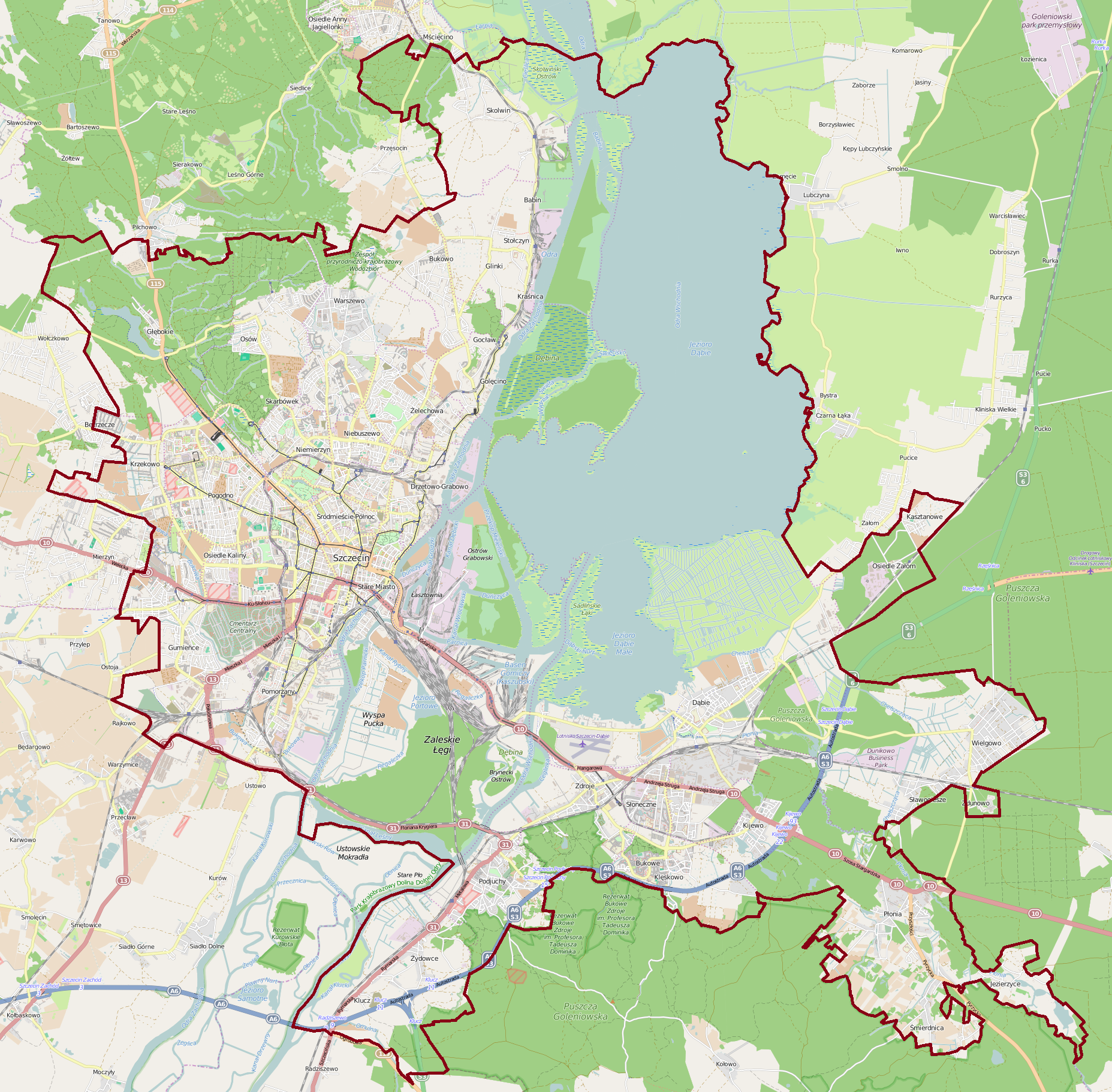
- Location within Szczecin Location within Poland
- Coordinates: 53.3502°N 14.5775°E
- Country: Poland
- Voivodeship: West Pomeranian
- County/City: Szczecin
- Neighbourhood: Żydowce-Klucz
- Time zone: UTC+1 (CET)
  - Summer (DST): UTC+2 (CEST)
- Vehicle registration: ZS

Żydowce is a part of the city of Szczecin, Poland situated on the right bank of the Oder river, in the southern part of the city.

== History ==
The area became part of the emerging Duchy of Poland under its first ruler Mieszko I around 967. Following Poland's fragmentation after the death of Bolesław III Wrymouth in 1138 it became part of an independent Duchy of Pomerania, which in 1227 became part of the Holy Roman Empire. As a result of the Ostsiedlung, it became known as Sydowsaue. During the Thirty Years' War, the settlement passed to the Swedish Empire, while remaining under the suzerainty of the Holy Roman Empire. Subsequently, it passed to Prussia. During World War II, on 7 February 1945, it was the site of a stopover during the German-organised march of some 6,000 Polish prisoners of war from the Oflag II-D camp headed westwards. After the war, the area became again part of Poland.
