= Castle Route =

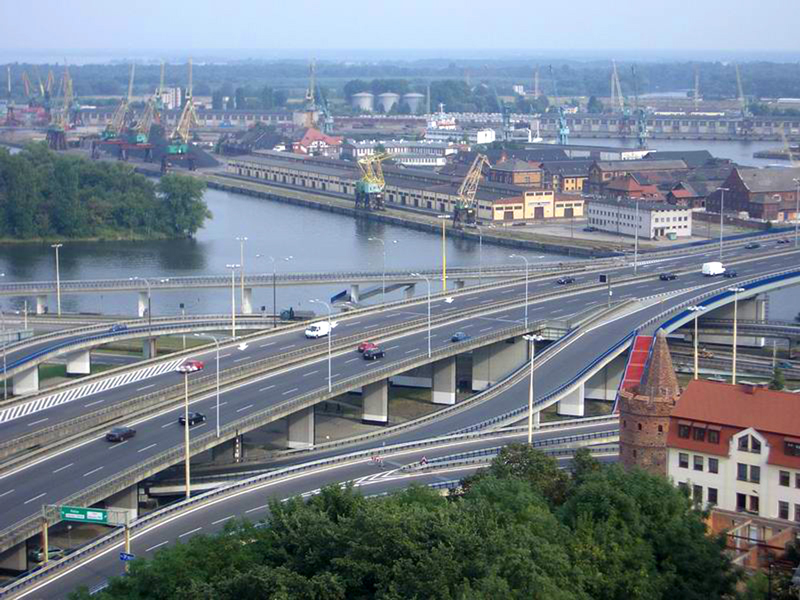
- The Castle Route as seen from the Ducal Castle.
- Coordinates: 53°25′32″N 14°33′56″E
- Carries: Voivodeship Road 115
- Crosses: Parnica canal, Łasztownia island, Oder river
- Locale: Szczecin, Poland
- Official name: Piotr Zaremba Castle Route

Characteristics
- Total length: 2,400 m (7,874.0 ft)
- Width: 18 m (59.1 ft)

History
- Opened: 1986 (partial opening); 1996 (end of final construction)

Location
- Interactive map of Castle Route

Piotr Zaremba Castle Route (Note: Polish: Trasa Zamkowa im. Piotra Zaremby; German: Piotr-Zaremba-Schlossroute) (Note: Until 1991: Józef Piłsudski Castle Route (Polish: Trasa Zamkowa im. Józefa Piłsudskiego), 1991–1996: Castle Route (Polish: Trasa Zamkowa; German: Schlossroute)) is an overpass road in Szczecin, Poland, that is a part of the Voivodeship Road 115. It is one of 4 main roads of Szczecin, connecting the city and Police County with the rest of Poland.

== Description ==
The Castle Route is 2.4 km (1.5 miles) long and 18 m (59 ft) wide. It consists of the series of overpasses, the bridge over Parnica canal, the overpass over Łasztownia island and the bridge over Oder river. The road has existed leaning north and west to the city centre, and through that, to Dobieszczyn, as well as the south exit leading to Police, and the east exit leading to the municipal neighborhoods of Międzyodrze-Wyspa Pucka and Prawobrzeże.

== History ==
Castle Route was built in place of Log Bridge that was destroyed during the World War II. The construction of the road began on 4 February 1978. The north entry road leading to the city center was finished in October 1987, and the north exit road leaning out of the city was finished in 1996, finishing the construction of the Castle Route.
