= Stołczyn =

Neighbourhood of Szczecin, Poland

- Administrative neighbourhood
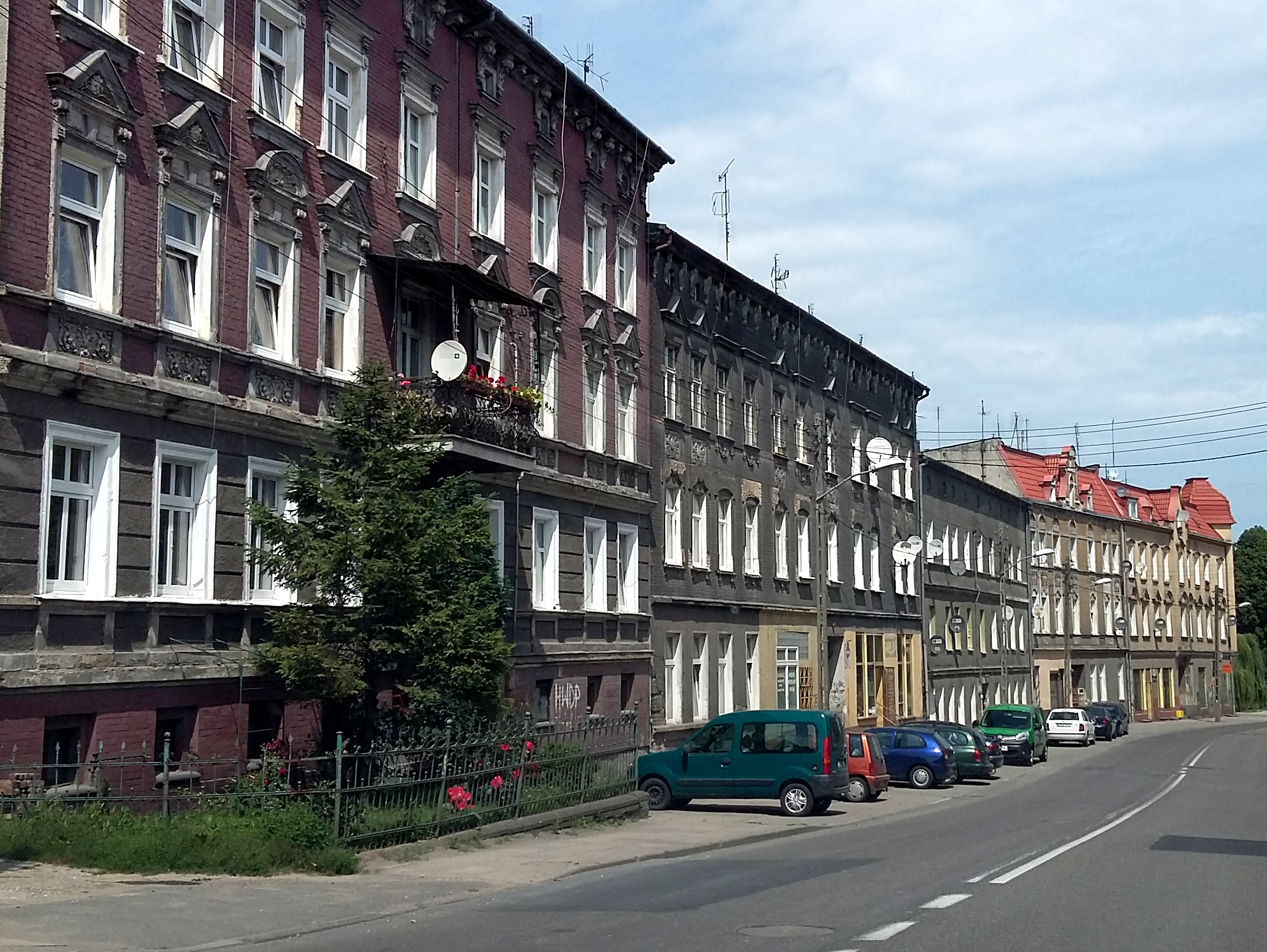
- The tenement houses on Nad Odrą Street.

- The location of Stołczyn within Szczecin.
- Coordinates: 53°29′37″N 14°36′11″E
- Country: Poland
- Voivodeship: West Pomeranian
- City and county: Szczecin
- District: North

Area
  - Total: 12.6 km^{2} (4.9 sq mi)

Population (2025)
  - Total: 4,895
- Time zone: UTC+1 (CET)
  - Summer (DST): UTC+2 (CEST)
- Area code: +48 91
- Car plates: ZS

Stołczyn (Polish: [ˈstɔw.t͡ʂɘ̟n]; German until 1945: Stolzenhagen [ˈʃtɔl.t͡sənˌhaː.ɡən]) is an administrative neighbourhood forming a subdivision of the North district in the city of Szczecin, Poland. It is a loosely-urbanised residential area, predominantly featuring single-family detached homes, with apartment buildings also present. The area also includes industrial buildings. The neighbourhood features the Immaculate Heart of the Blessed Virgin Mary, a Gothic Roman Catholic parish church, which was built in the 13th century, and later rebuilt and expanded in the 15th and 18th centuries. It also includes the Szczecin Stołczyn railway station. The neighbourhood has an area of 12.6 km^{2} (4.9 sq mi), and in 2025, was inhabited by 4,895. Its mainland portion is placed on the west coast of the West Oder river. Off its coast, it also includes the northern half of the island of Dębina, as well as the Duck Island, Seagull Island, and Żurawi Ostrów, bordered to the west by Dąbie lake. Neither of the islands are inhabited. Additionally, the area also includes the historic neighbourhoods of Glinki and Kraśnica.

Stołczyn was founded in the 13th century as a farming community, and by the early 20th century, developed into an industrial area, merging with the nearby villages of Glinki and Kraśnica. The area was incorporated into the city in 1939.

== Toponomy ==
The Polish name Stołczyn comes from its former German name, Stolzenhagen. It came from words Stolz meaning "pride", and Hagen from Middle High German meaning "enclosure". In 1945, it was originally rendered in Polish as Stolec, and later changed to its current name in 1946.

== History ==
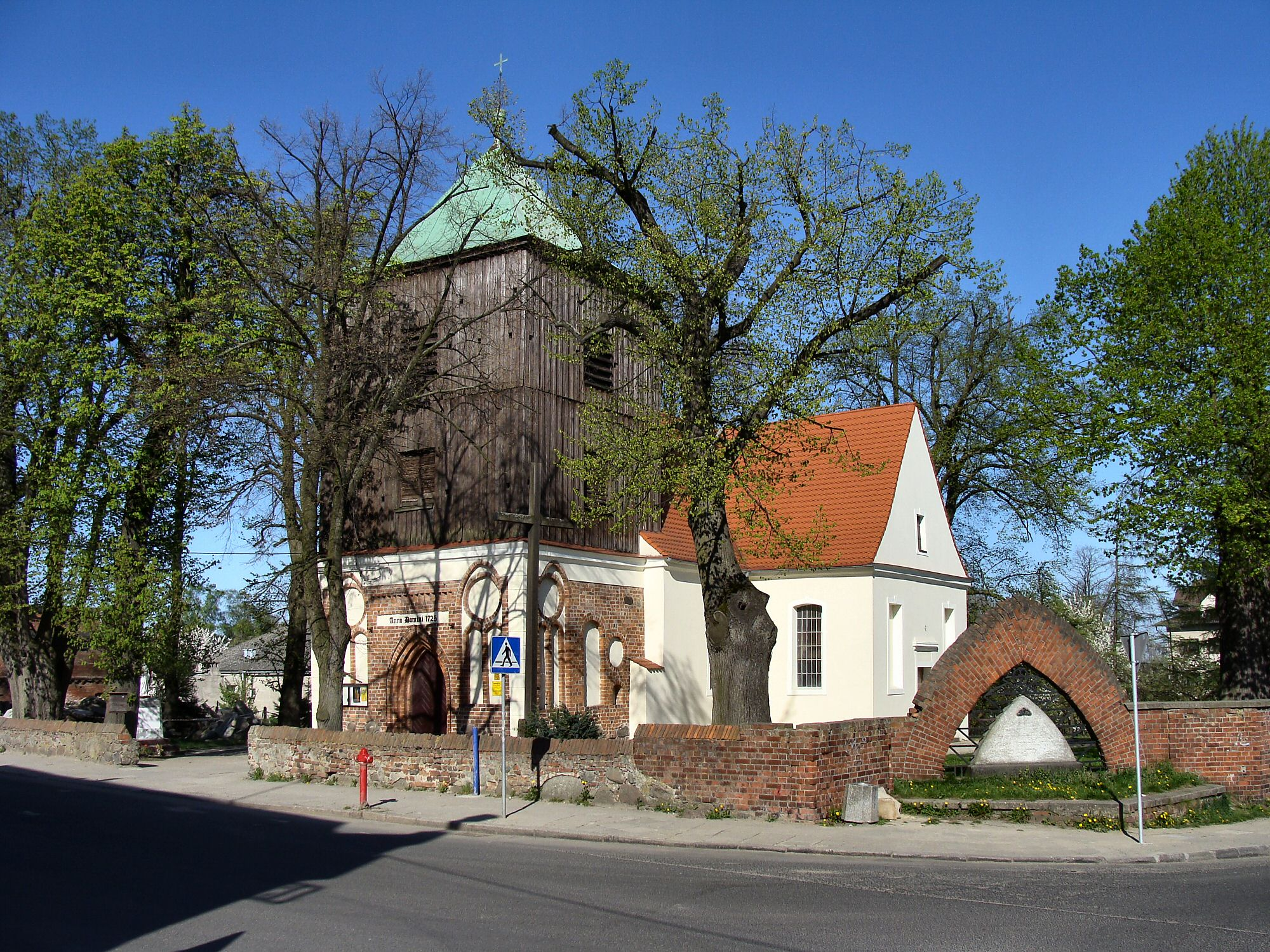
The Church of the Immaculate Heart of the Blessed Virgin Mary, originally built in the 13th century, and later rebuilt and expanded in the 15th and 18th centuries.

The village of Stołczyn (German: Stolzenhagen) was founded in the 13th century as a farming community, by the Stolzenhagen family, which was part of nobility in Brandenburg. It was originally founded along the current Nehringa Street. The oldest known records of the settlement come from 1260, in a document issued by duke Barnim I, ruler of the Duchy of Pomerania-Stettin, in which he granted one lan of land, an equivalent to around 9.82 ha, to the Cistercian female monastery in Szczecin (Stettin).

In the 13th century, a Roman Catholic church, now known as the Church of the Immaculate Heart of the Blessed Virgin Mary, was built in Stołczyn. It was originally owned by the Cistercian female monastery in Szczecin, and later by the Carthusian monastery in Grabowo (Grabow). In the 15th century, it was rebuilt in the Gothic style, and was later expanded in the 1720s in the Baroque style. Its denomination was changed to the Lutheranism in the 16th century during the Protestant Reformation, and was returned to the former in 1946. The church was renovated in 1982, with its Gothic elements being restored.

At the end of the 14th century, majority of the land of the village was owned by the Carthusian monastery in Grabowo, while other sizable portion belonged to the Church of the Immaculate Heart of the Blessed Virgin Mary in Stołczyn and the Cistercian monastery in Szczecin. A small portion was also owned by landowners from Szczecin. It remained in such state until the first half of the 16th century. Following the Protestant Reformation, Stołczyn became part of the estate of the Duke of Pomerania. The village was heavily demerged during the Thirty Years' War, and was rebuilt in the 18th century.

Between 1824 and 1828, the serfdom was abolished in Stołczyn, with the local farmers receiving the ownership of the land in the village. Following this, the settlement experiences economic growth and increase of its population. In 1285, it had 1,123 residents. The number of people employed in farming decreased, with the increase of employment in the manufacturing industry. The village had five brickworks, with the first being opened in 1855. The housing in the village expanded, with new developments, increasing its size, with its boundaries being pushed closer to the nearby villages of Glinki (Glienken) and Kraśnica (Kratzwieck). The former was located in the area of the current Nad Odrą, Golęcińska, Nehringa, and Księżnej Dąbrówki Streets, and the later, in the area of Nad Odrą and Kościelna Streets. At the beginning of the 20th century, their areas conjoined into one agglomeration. Stołczyn continued to be predominately farming settlement, while Kraśnica was an industrial district, and Glinki was a fishing settlement, being placed next to the West Oder river. In 1900, Stołczyn had a population of 3,600 people, while in 1905, it had a population of 5,000 people, of which 58% were employed in the manufacturing industry, and 6% in farming.

In the second half of the 19th century, a cemetery was founded near the corner of the current Nehringa and Golęcińska Streets. It was opened after a churchyard cemetery of the Church of the Immaculate Heart of the Blessed Virgin Mary became full. It was since then fully removed. The cemetery on Nehringa Street was later expanded in the early 20th century. After the end of the Second World War, a portion of the German graves were exhumed, and the cemetery was used by the Polish community until 1954, being closed afterwards. In 1999, the dilapidated cemetery was cleaned up and renovated, being reopened as a public park. Bodies of ten Polish people were exhumed and moved to the Central Cemetery, while around one hundred German gravestones from the interwar period were displayed in the park alleyways as a lapidarium.

In 1897, the Kraft ironworks was founded at the current 10 Nad Odrą Street in Kraśnica, being owned by Guido Henckel von Donnersmarck, a nobleman, industrial magnate, and one of the wealthiest people in the world at the time. In 1945, it became a state-owned enterprise of the Polish government, under the name Huta Szczecin (lit. 'Szczecin Ironworks'). In 1996, it became a private company. It was closed down in 2008, and demolished in 2009.

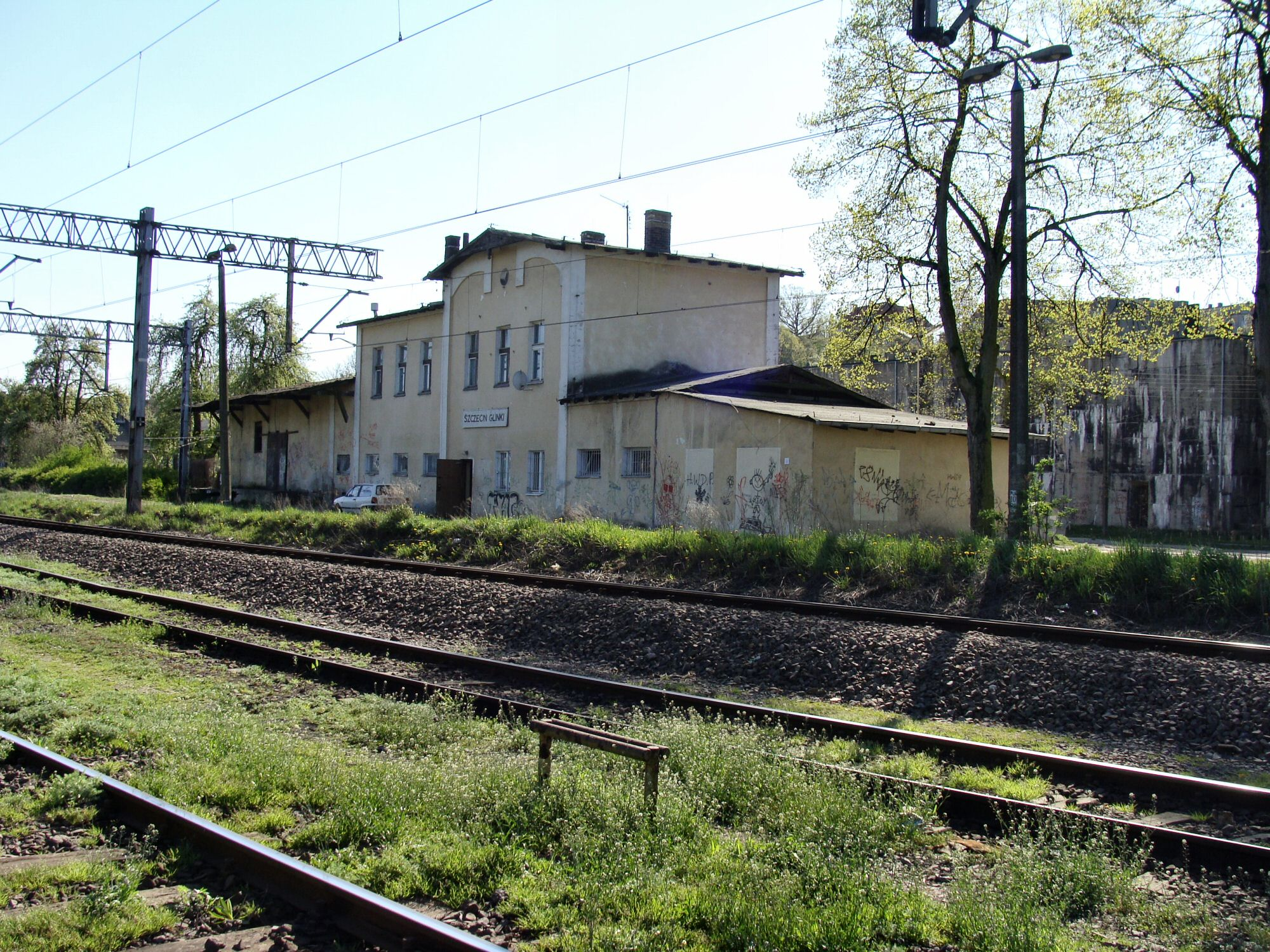
The Szczecin Stołczyn railway station, opened in 1898

In 1898, the Szczecin Stołczyn railway station, originally named Stolzenhagen-Kratzwieck was opened on the current Kolejowa Street, as part of the line between Szczecin Main Station and Trzebież. It was electrified in 1982.

In the late 1920s, a housing estate of Randsiedlung (lit. 'peripheral settlement') was built in the area of current Ludgardy, Kolonistów, Do Dworu Streets as an extension of the neighbourhood of Stołczyn. In the 1930s, a housing estate of Nockshöhe, in the area of the current intersection of the Szosy Polskiej and Ostoi-Zagórskiego Streets. Both neighbourhoods consisted of single-family detached and semi-detached homes, and became together known as Stołczyn Zachodni (West-Stolzenhagen).

On 15 October 1939, Stołczyn, together with surrounding settlements of Glinki, Kraśnica, and Stołczyn Zachodni, was incorporated into the city of Szczecin. At the time, Stołczyn and Kraśnica had a combined population of 6,335 people. It was captured by the Red Army of the Soviet Union on 26 April 1945 during the Second World War. The city was placed under the Polish administration on 5 July 1945, while its suburbs, including the area of Stołczyn, Glinki, and Kraśnica, were placed under the Soviet military occupation. The neighbourhood became part of the Police Enclave, an area of the occupation, which while officially part of the territory of Poland, was administrated as part of the Randow District in the Soviet occupation zone in Germany. It was created to facilitate the removal of the machinery and resources of the Hydrierwerke Pölitz AG factory in the nearby Police, and its transportation to the Soviet Union. Over 20,000 workers and prisoners of war from Germany worked on the project in the Police Enclave, while Polish population was not allowed to settle in the area. Its southern portion, including Stołczyn and its surroundings, was abolished on 19 July 1946, and subsequently incorporated into the city. Following the end of the conflict, the German population either fled or was expelled from Szczecin, and was replaced by Polish settlers, who begun moving in to Stołczyn following its incorporation. In 1945, Stołczyn, previously known in German as Stolzenhagen, became known by Polish population as Stolec, and was later officially renamed in 1946 to its current name. After 1945, the new housing of the neighbourhood of Bukowo near Stołczyn Zachodni, with both becoming conjoined.

In 1949, the Hutnik Szczecin association football club was founded, originally as a company team for the employees of the Huta Szczecin ironworks. Previously, it competed in the Third and Fourth Leagues, and since 2023, competes in the Regional Leaque of the Polish football. It is based at 69 Nehringa Street.

From 1955 to 1976, the neighbourhood of Glinki-Stołczyn formed one of the administrative subdivisions of the Nad Odrą district. In 1960, it had the population of 6,595 people. On 28 November 1990, the neighbourhood of Stołczyn was established as one of the administrative subdivisions of the North district, being governed by an elected neighbourhood council. It incorporated the neighbourhoods of Stołczyn, Glinki, and Kraśnica, as well as the northern half of the island of Dębina, as well as the Duck Island, Seagull Island, and Żurawi Ostrów. The area of Stołczyn Zachodni was incorporated into the neighbourhood of Bukowo.

== Characteristics ==
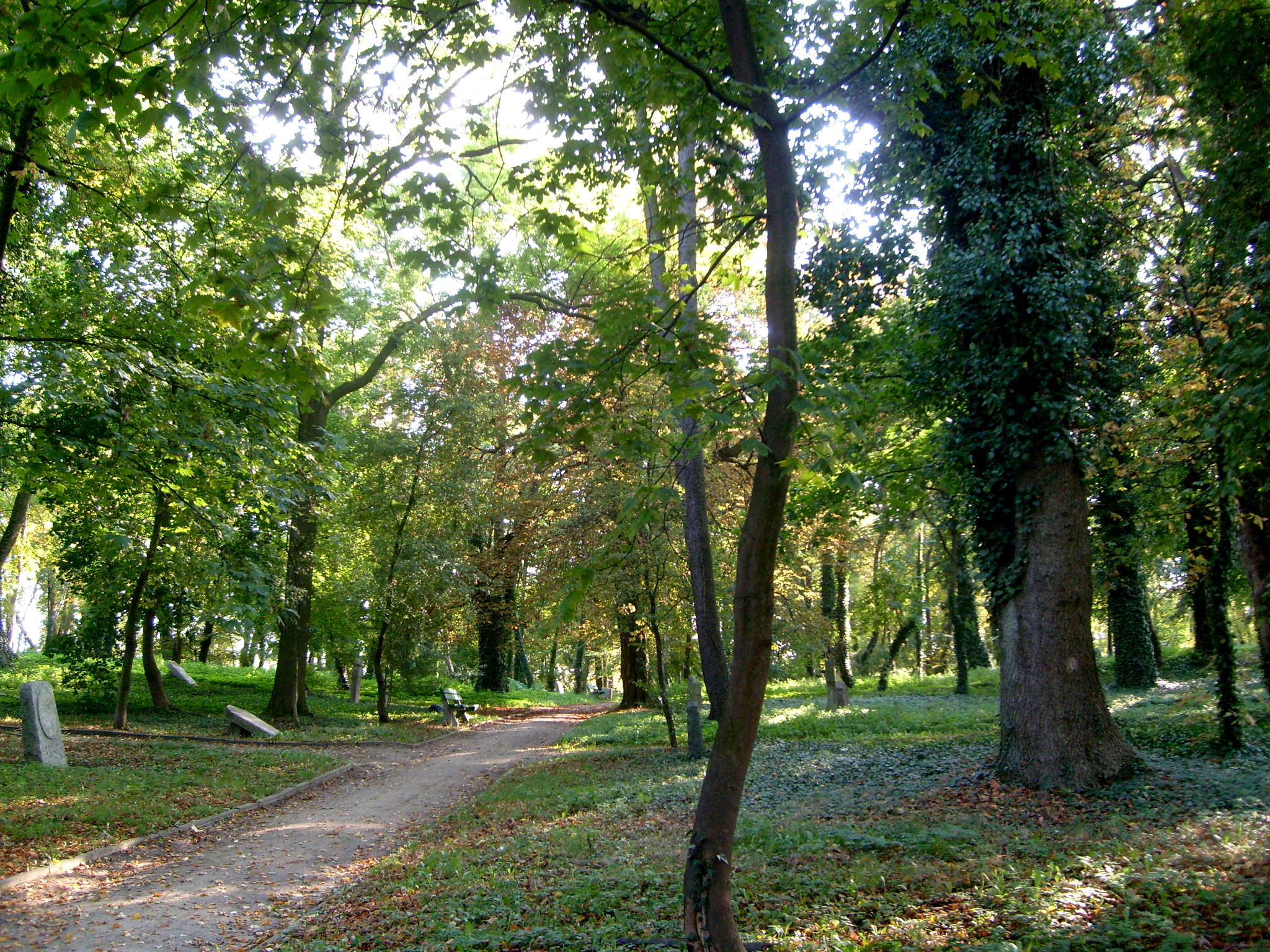
The Nehringa Street Park in Stołczyn, with a lapidarium in place of a former 19th-century cemetery.

Stołczyn is a loosely-urbanised residential area, predominantly featuring single-family detached homes, with apartment buildings also present. It also includes the historic neighbourhoods of Glinki and Kraśnica. The former is located in the area of the current Nad Odrą, Golęcińska, Nehringa, and Księżnej Dąbrówki Streets, and the later, in the area of Nad Odrą and Kościelna Streets. The area also includes industrial buildings. Stołczyn includes the Immaculate Heart of the Blessed Virgin Mary, located at 4 Kościelna Street, which belongs to the Roman Catholic denomination. It was originally built in the 13th century, and later rebuilt in 15th century, it was rebuilt in the Gothic style, and was later expanded in the 1720s. The neighbourhoods also features the Szczecin Stołczyn railway station, placed on Kolejowa Street, which forms a part the line between Szczecin Main Station and Trzebież. Stołczyn also includes a small urban park located at the corner of Nehringa and Golęcińska Streets, in form of a lapidarium in place a former cemetery from the second half of the 19th century.

The northwestern side of the area is placed on the Przęsocin Plateau, a part of the Warszewo Hills. In the north it includes the Połaniec, Skolwinka, Stołczynka, and Żółwinka streams. Their area is covered by the Three Streams Forest. In the east, the mainland part of the neighbourhood borders the West Oder river. It also includes the northern side of the island of Dębina, placed between the river and Dąbie lake. Its crossed though by several man-made water canals, including the Leśniczówka Canal. To the north, the neighbourhood also includes four small islands. They are Duck Island, Seagull Island, and two islands known collectively as Żurawi Ostrów. They are surrounded by water canals of Babina, Czapina, Iński Nurt, Skolwin Canal. Neither of the islands are inhabited.

The neighbourhood also includes the Hutnik Szczecin association football club, based at 69 Nehringa Street. Founded in 1949, it currently competes in the Regional Leaque, previously also competed in the Third and Fourth Leagues of the Polish football.

== Demographics ==
Historical population
Year	2008	2009	2010	2011	2012	2013	2014	2015	2016	2017	2018	2019	2020	2021	2025
Pop.	4,669	4,655	4,451	4,381	4,342	4,307	4,315	4,304	4,281	4,234	4,179	4,193	4,318	4,437	4,895
±%	—	−0.3%	−4.4%	−1.6%	−0.9%	−0.8%	+0.2%	−0.3%	−0.5%	−1.1%	−1.3%	+0.3%	+3.0%	+2.8%	+10.3%

== Government and boundaries ==
Stołczyn is one of the administrative neighbourhoods forming a subdivision of the North district in the city of Szczecin, Poland. It is governed by a locally elected neighbourhood council with 15 members. Its headquarters are located at 28 Kościelna Street. Its boundaries are approximately determined by the city boundaries, the borders with the neighbourhoods of Bukowo, Golęcino-Gocław, and Skolwin, Szosa Polska Street, the Iński Nurt canal, and Dąbie lake. Stołczyn borders the neighbourhoods of Bukowo, Dąbie, Golęcino-Gocław, and Skolwin, and the municipality of Police in Police County The neighbourhood has the total area of 12.6 km^{2} (4.9 sq mi).
