= Trzebusz, Szczecin =

Neighbourhood of Szczecin, Poland

Coordinates: 53°24′16″N 14°43′00″E

Trzebusz has been part of the city of Szczecin, Poland since May 1948. It is situated on the right bank of the Regalica, a tributary of the Oder river, east of Szczecin Old Town, and Szczecin-Dąbie.
