= Wielka Kępa (island) =

Uninhabited island in Poland

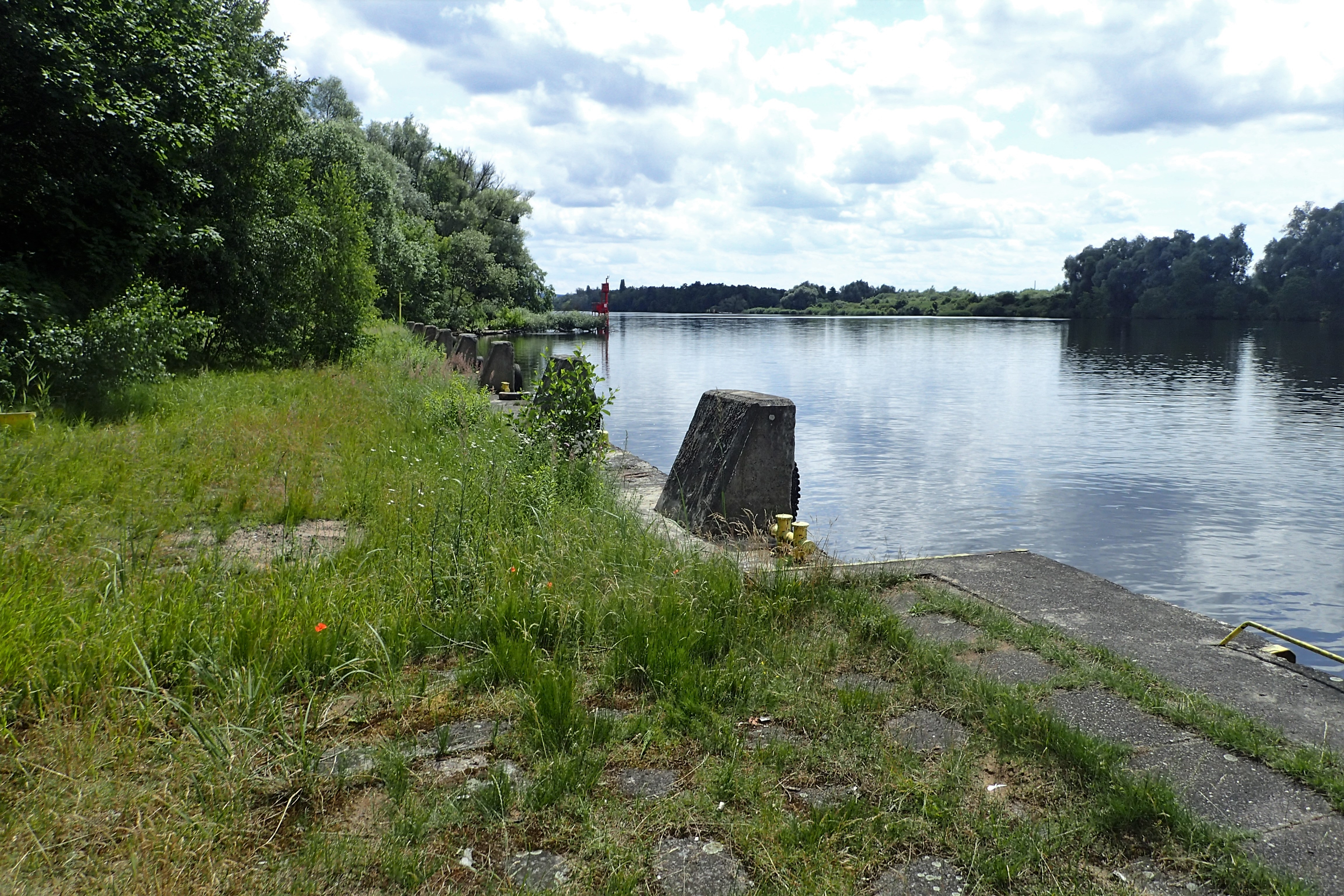
- Waterfront on the western shore of the island

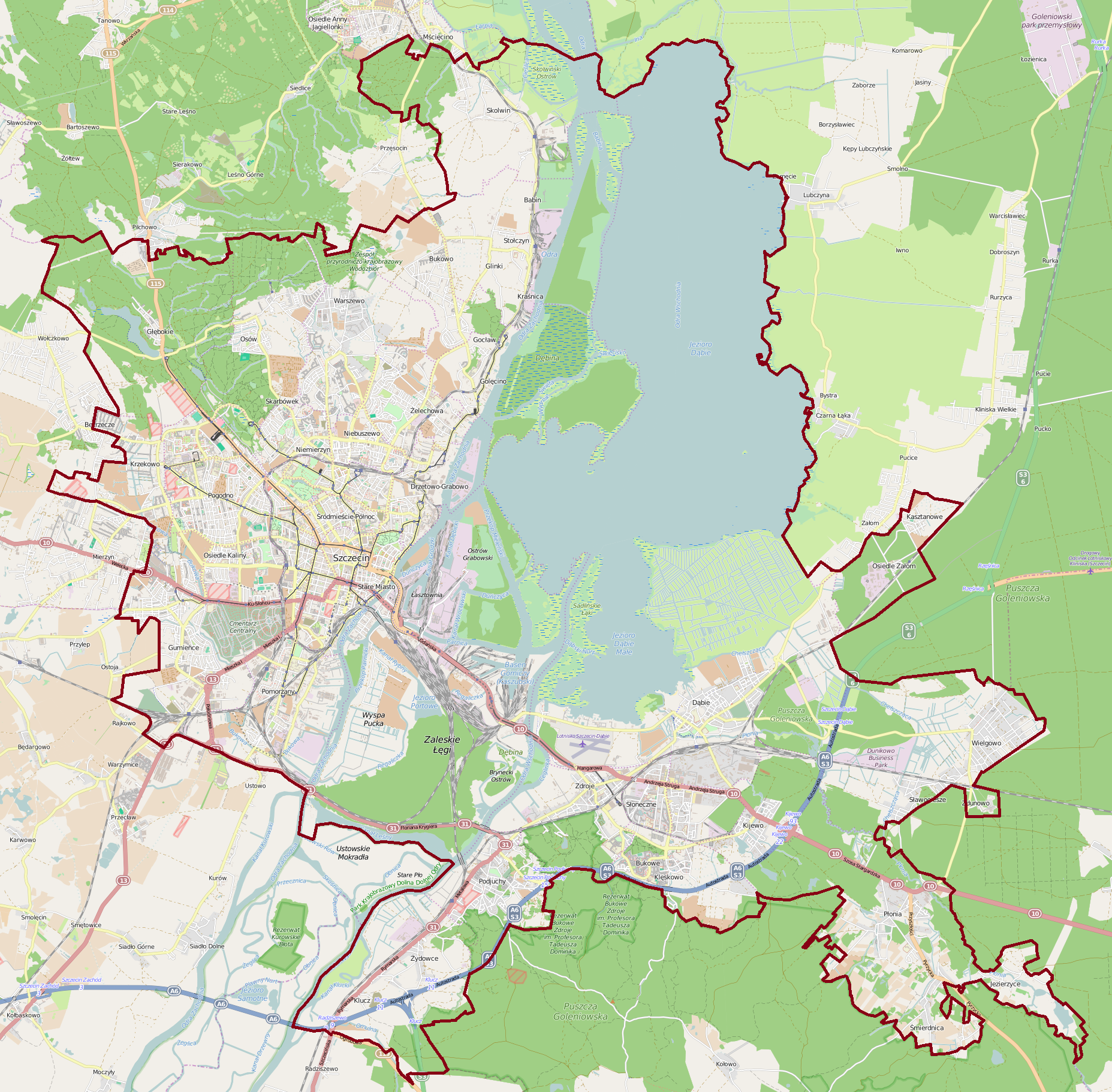
- Location within Szczecin

Geography
- Location: Europe
- Coordinates: 53°25′54″N 14°36′36″E
- Adjacent to: Przekop Mieleński – Orli Przesmyk – Duńczyca, Dąbie Lake

Administration
- Poland

Demographics
- Population: 0

Wielka Kępa is an uninhabited island in the Międzyodrze area, located on the western shore of Dąbie Lake in Szczecin, north-western Poland.

The island lies within the Śródmieście district (subdivision: Międzyodrze–Wyspa Pucka). It constitutes the south-eastern part of the former island of Fette Ort. It is separated from Ostrów Grabowski to the west by the Przekop Mieleński, from Radolin to the north by the Orli Przesmyk, and from the south it is bordered by the mouth section of the Duńczyca and Duńczyca Zachodnia, beyond which lies Mieleńska Łąka.

On the side facing Lake Dąbie there is the former municipal bathing area, Plaża Mieleńska. On the side of Przekop Mieleński there used to be a marina for the so-called "white fleet", which historically transported residents of Szczecin to the island. Since 1995 the island had been leased by a private company, though the agreement has since expired. Municipal plans once included reopening the bathing area in 2009.
