= Cranosauruses =

Historical container cranes in Szczecin, Poland

- The Cranosauruses in 2026.

General information
- Type: Container cranes
- Location: 6 Tadeusza Apolinarego Wendy Street, Międzyodrze-Wyspa Pucka, Szczecin, Poland
- Coordinates: 53°25′35.01″N 14°34′06.61″E
- Completed: 1930s
- Owner: Szczecin National Museum

The Cranosauruses (Polish: Dźwigozaury; German: Kranosaurier) are three historic small container cranes in the city of Szczecin, Poland. They are located at a waterfront promenade of Łasztownia island, at 6 Tadeusza Apolinarego Wendy Street, near the Marine Science Centre. They are located within the neighbourhood of Międzyodrze-Wyspa Pucka. They were originally constructed in the 1930s, and remained in use until the early 2000s. Subsequently, they became the property of the Szczecin National Museum. They were renovated between 2016 and 2017, and are now seen as a recognizable symbol of the city.

== History ==
The three container cranes were installed in the port of Łasztownia island in the 1930s, to be used on breakbulk cargo reloading, and were probably manufactured by the company Krupp. They remained operational until the early 2000s. In 2009, the port authority donated them to the Szczecin National Museum. They were renovated between 2016 and February 2017, and repainted to their original paint scheme. The cranes also began being sporadically illuminated with colourful light installations, which, since 2018, became a nightly occurrence. The machines, nicknamed the Cranosauruses (from words crane and dinosaur), quickly aroused in popularity, and became seen as a recognizable symbol of the city.

== Characteristics ==
Cranosauruses are three small container cranes that stand next to each other on the Oder river waterfront, at a promenade of Łasztownia island. They are placed at 6 Tadeusza Apolinarego Wendy Street, near the Marine Science Centre. They are owned by the Szczecin National Museum. The cranes are painted with a brown base, green cabin, and yellow boom. They are illuminated with colourful light installations every night from 4 pm to 12 pm.

== Gallery ==
One of the Cranosauruses.

The Cranosauruses illuminated at night.
