= Glinki, Szczecin =

Neighbourhood of Szczecin, Poland

Glinki
- Neighbourhood
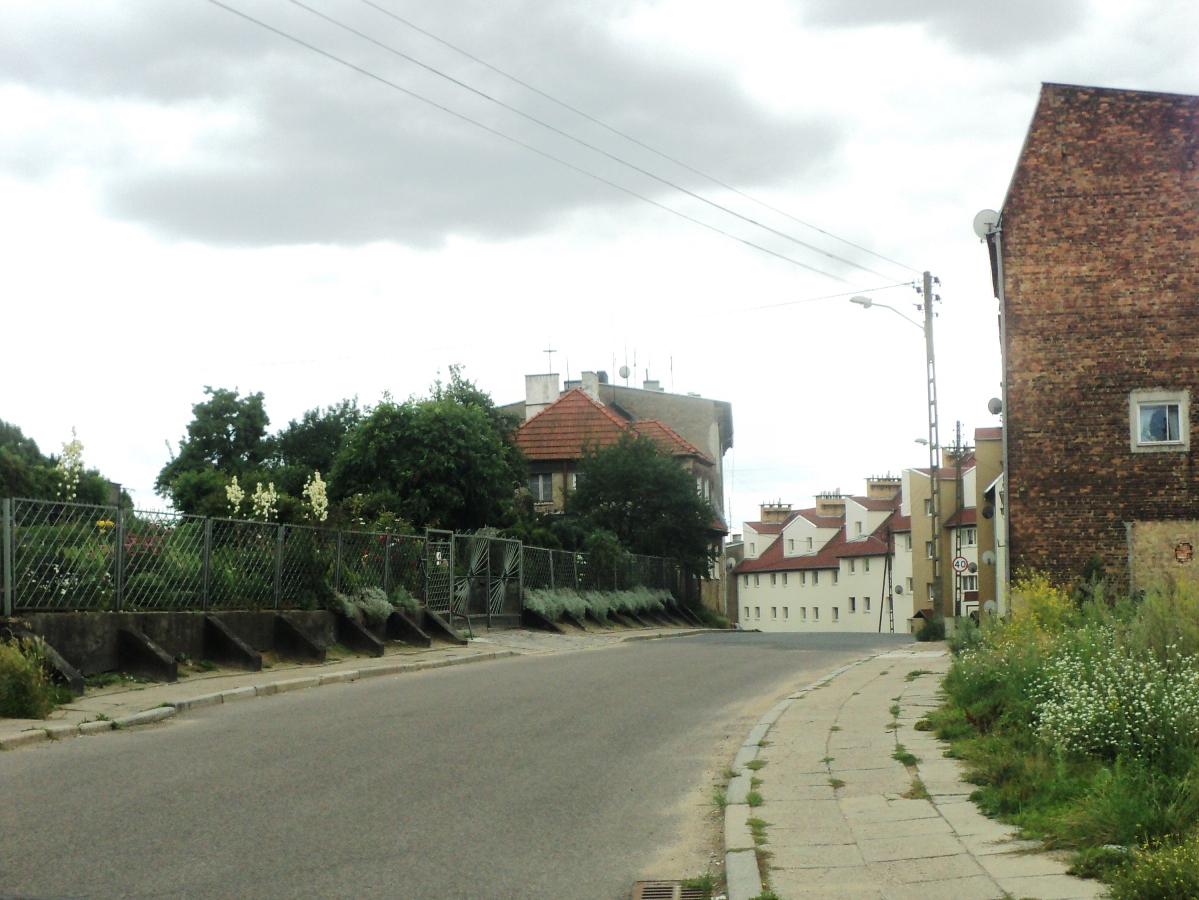
- The tenement houses on Księżnej Dąbrówki Street in Glinki in 2012.
- Interactive map of Glinki
- Coordinates: 53.491959°N 14.606574°E
- Country: Poland
- Voivodeship: West Pomeranian
- City and county: Szczecin
- District: North
- Administrative neighbourhood: Stołczyn
- Time zone: UTC+1 (CET)
  - Summer (DST): UTC+2 (CEST)
- Area code: +48 91
- Car plates: ZS

Glinki (Polish: [ˈɡlin.ki]; German until 1945: Glienken [ˈɡlɪən.ken]) is a neighbourhood of Szczecin, Poland, located within the North district, in the southeastern portion of the administrative subdivision of Stołczyn. It is a loosely-urbanised residential area, predominantly featuring single-family detached homes, with apartment buildings also present. It also includes industrial buildings. It is placed in the area of Nad Odrą, Golęcińska, Nehringa, and Księżnej Dąbrówki Streets, and on the coast of the West Oder river. In the 19th century, Glinki was a fishing village, which, in the beginning of the 20th century, formed a cojoined agglomeration with the nearby villages of Kraśnica and Stołczyn. It was incorporated into the city of Szczecin in 1939.

== History ==
In the 19th century, Glinki (German: Glienken) was a fishing village, located in the area of the current Nad Odrą, Golęcińska, Nehringa, and Księżnej Dąbrówki Streets, next to the West Oder river. At the beginning of the 20th century, it formed one conjoined agglomeration with the nearby villages of Kraśnica (Kratzwieck) and Stołczyn (Stolzenhagen).

In 1898, the Szczecin Stołczyn railway station was opened on the current Kolejowa Street, to the northeast of Glinki. It was known as Glinki-Kraśnica in 1947, and as Szczecin Glinki from 1947 to 2020. It was electrified in 1982.

On 15 October 1939, Glinki was incorporated into the city of Szczecin. It was captured by the Red Army of the Soviet Union on 26 April 1945 during the Second World War. The city was placed under the Polish administration on 5 July 1945, while its suburbs, including Glinki, were placed under the Soviet military occupation The neighbourhood became part of the Police Enclave, an area of the occupation, which while officially part of the territory of Poland, was administrated as part of the Randow District in the Soviet occupation zone in Germany. It was created to facilitate the removal of the machinery and resources of the Hydrierwerke Pölitz AG factory in the nearby Police, and its transportation to the Soviet Union. Over 20,000 workers and prisoners of war from Germany worked on the project in the Police Enclave, while Polish population was not allowed to settle in the area. Its southern portion, including Glinki, was abolished on 19 July 1946, and subsequently incorporated into the city. Following the end of the conflict, the German population either fled or was expelled from Szczecin, and was replaced by Polish settlers, who begun moving in to Glinki following its incorporation.

From 1955 to 1976, the neighbourhood of Glinki-Stołczyn formed one of the administrative subdivisions of the Nad Odrą district. It included the neighbourhoods of Glinki, Kraśnica, and Stołczyn. On 28 November 1990, the neighbourhood of Stołczyn was established as one of the administrative subdivisions of the North district, being governed by an elected neighbourhood council, incorporating the area of Glinki.

== Characteristics ==
Glinki is a loosely-urbanised residential area, predominantly featuring single-family detached homes, with apartment buildings also present. It is placed in the area of Nad Odrą, Golęcińska, Nehringa, and Księżnej Dąbrówki Streets, and on the coast of the West Oder river. The area also includes industrial buildings on Nad Odrą Street.
