= Międzyodrze-Wyspa Pucka =

- Municipal neighbourhood
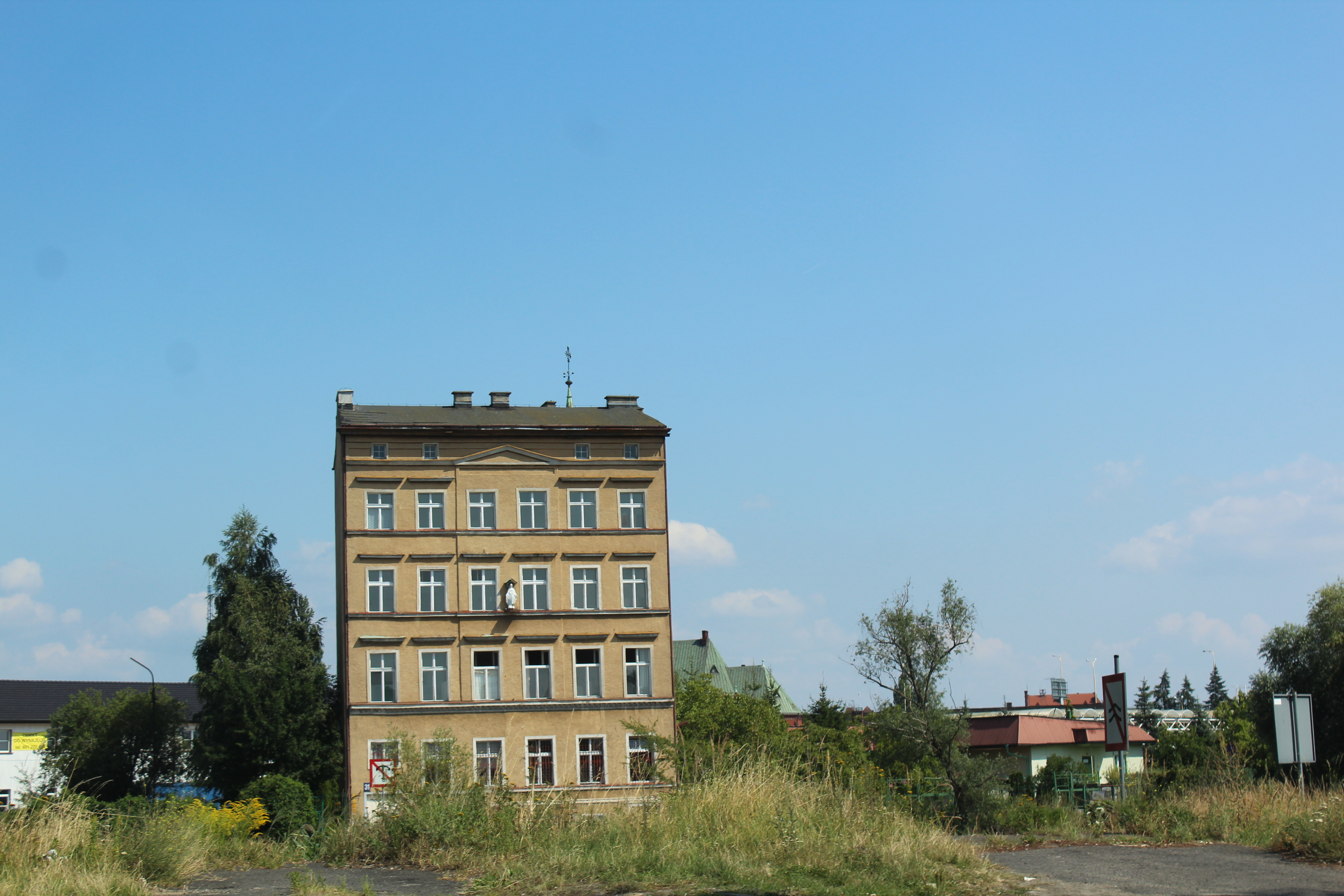
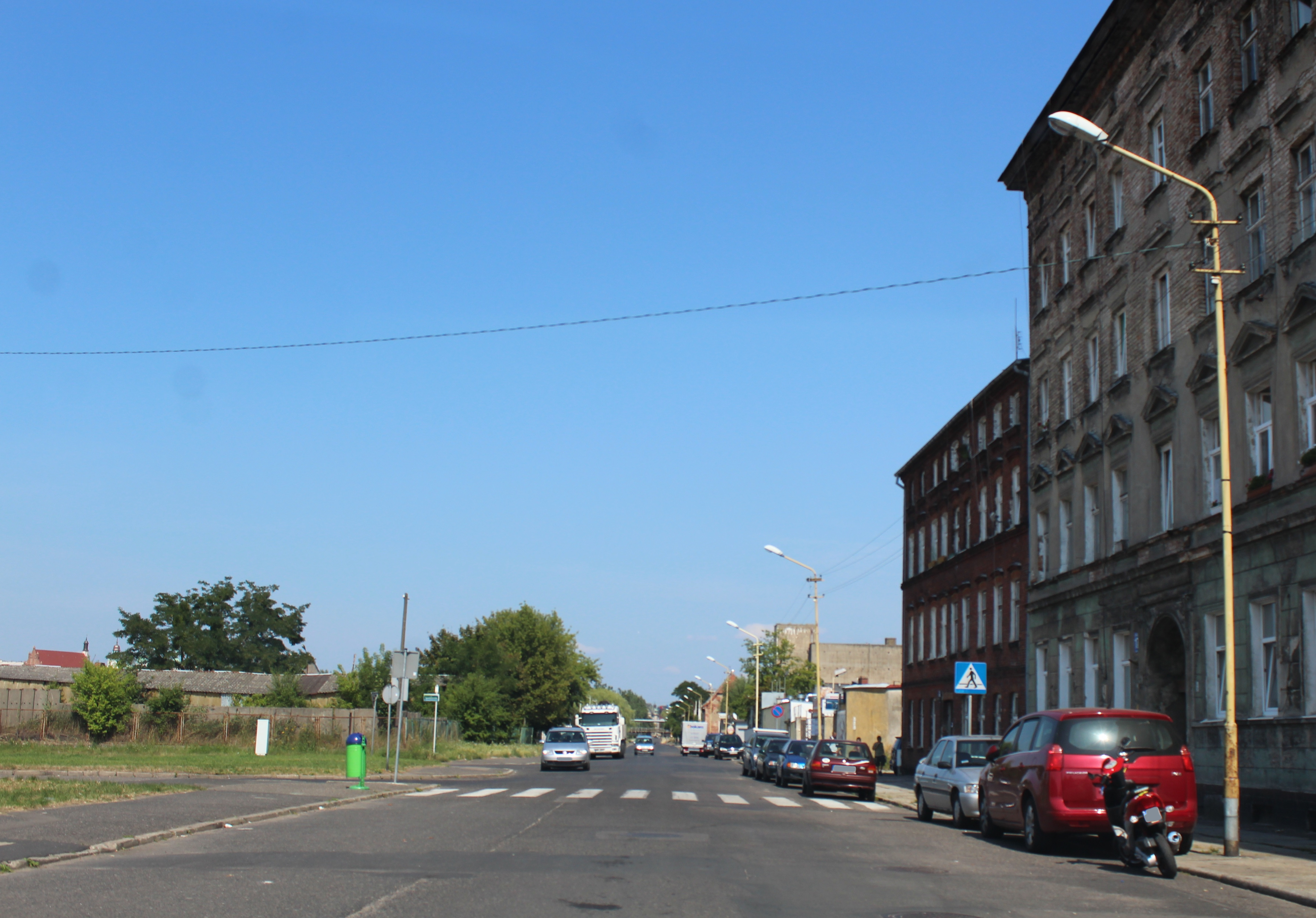
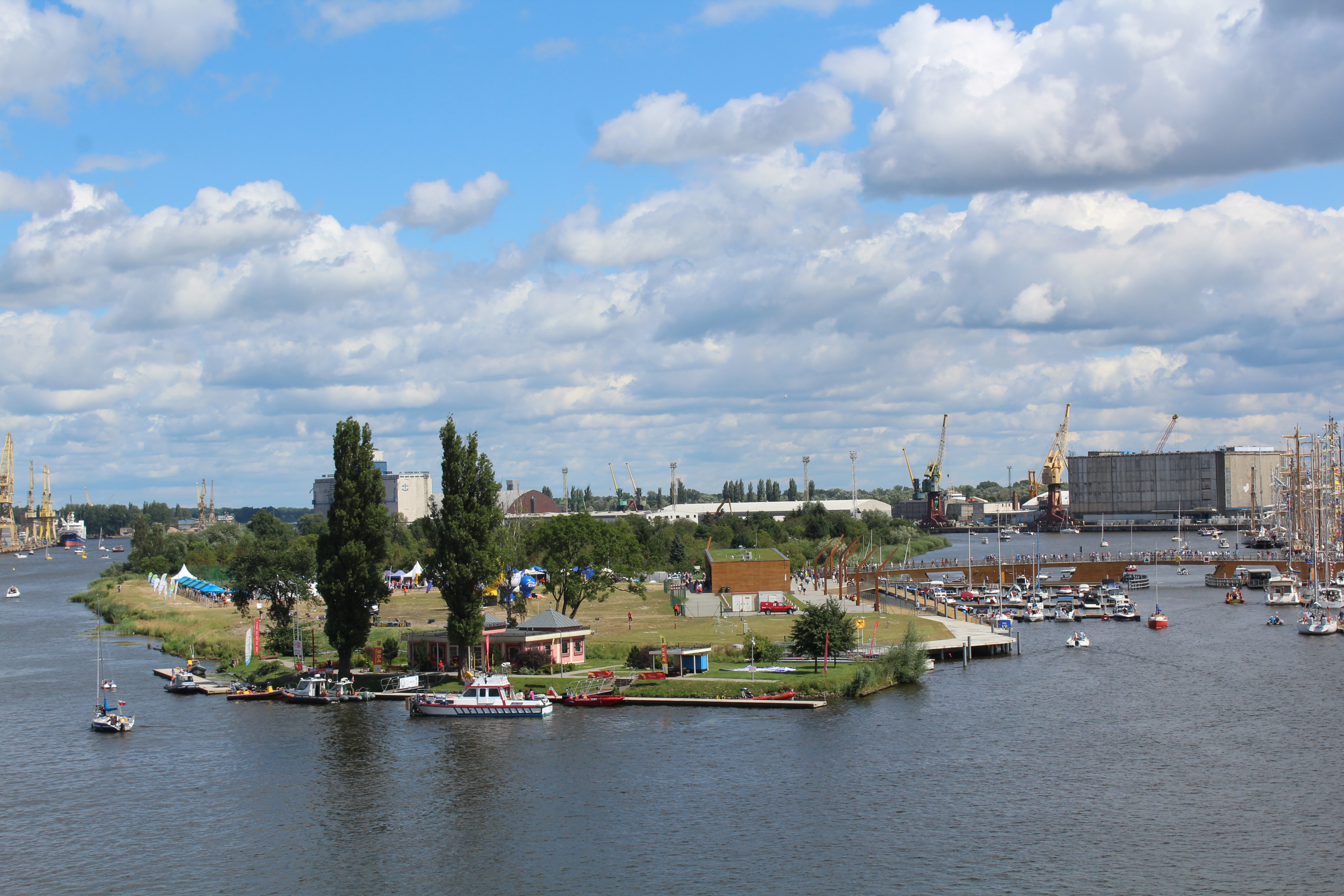
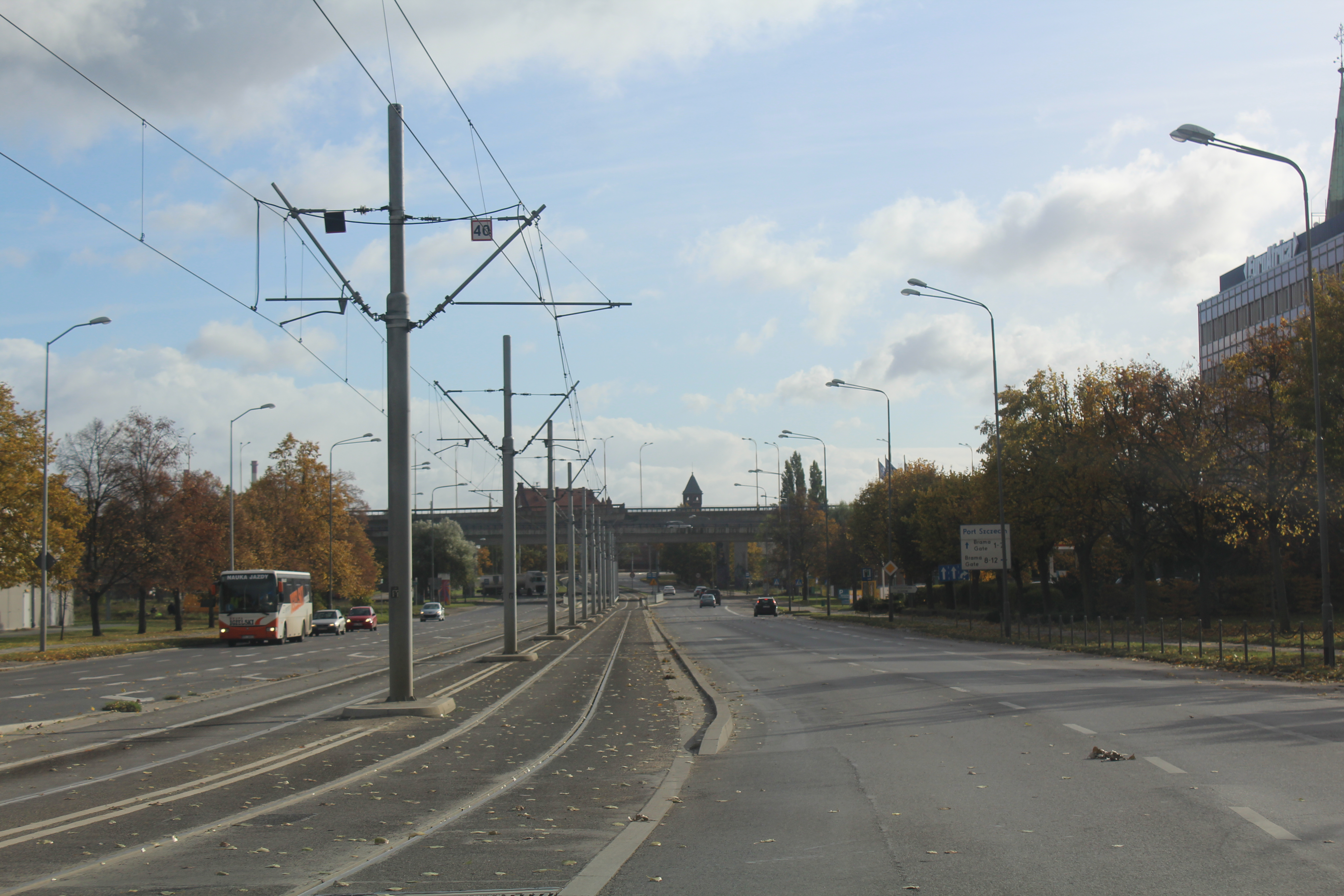
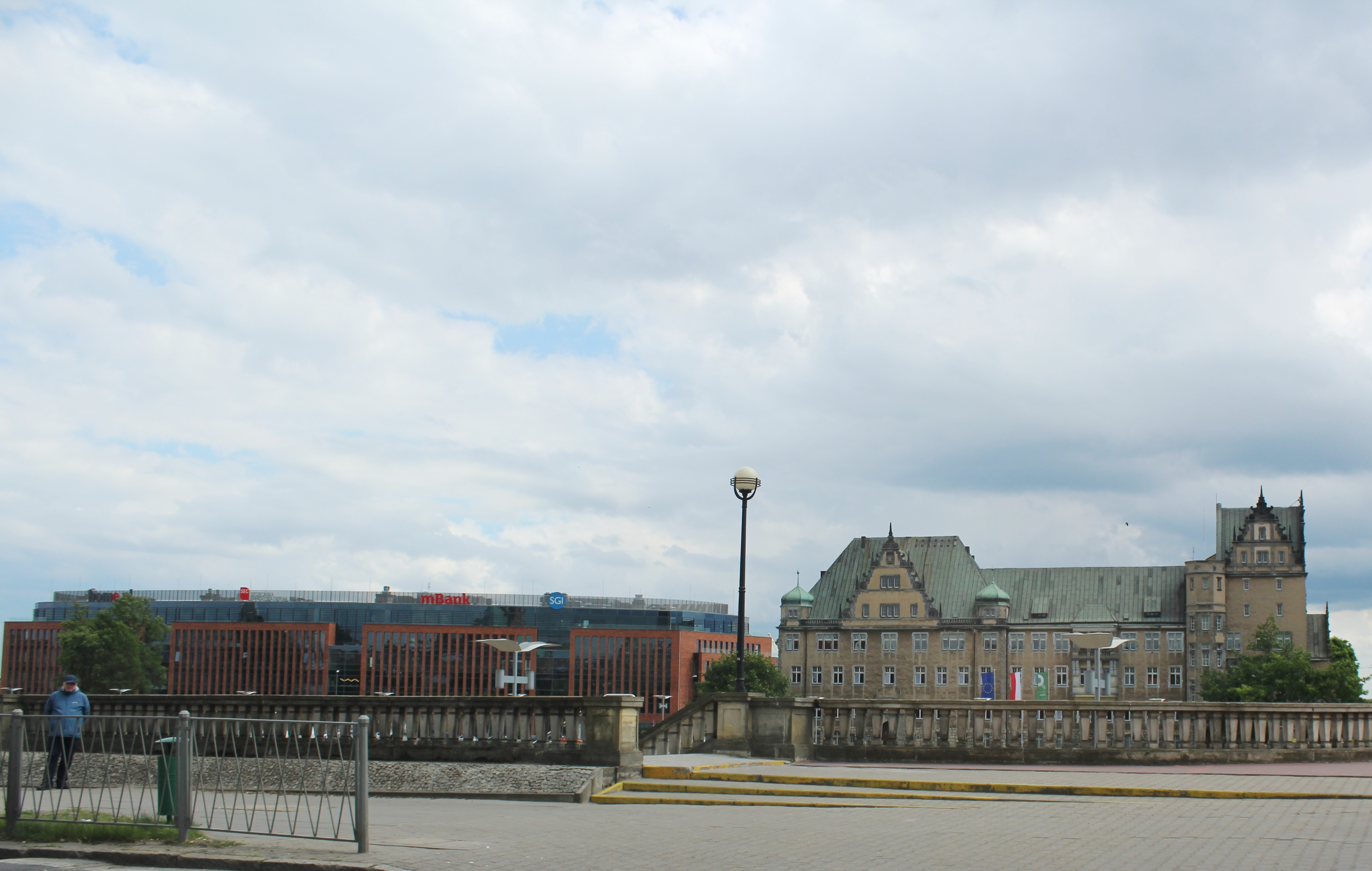
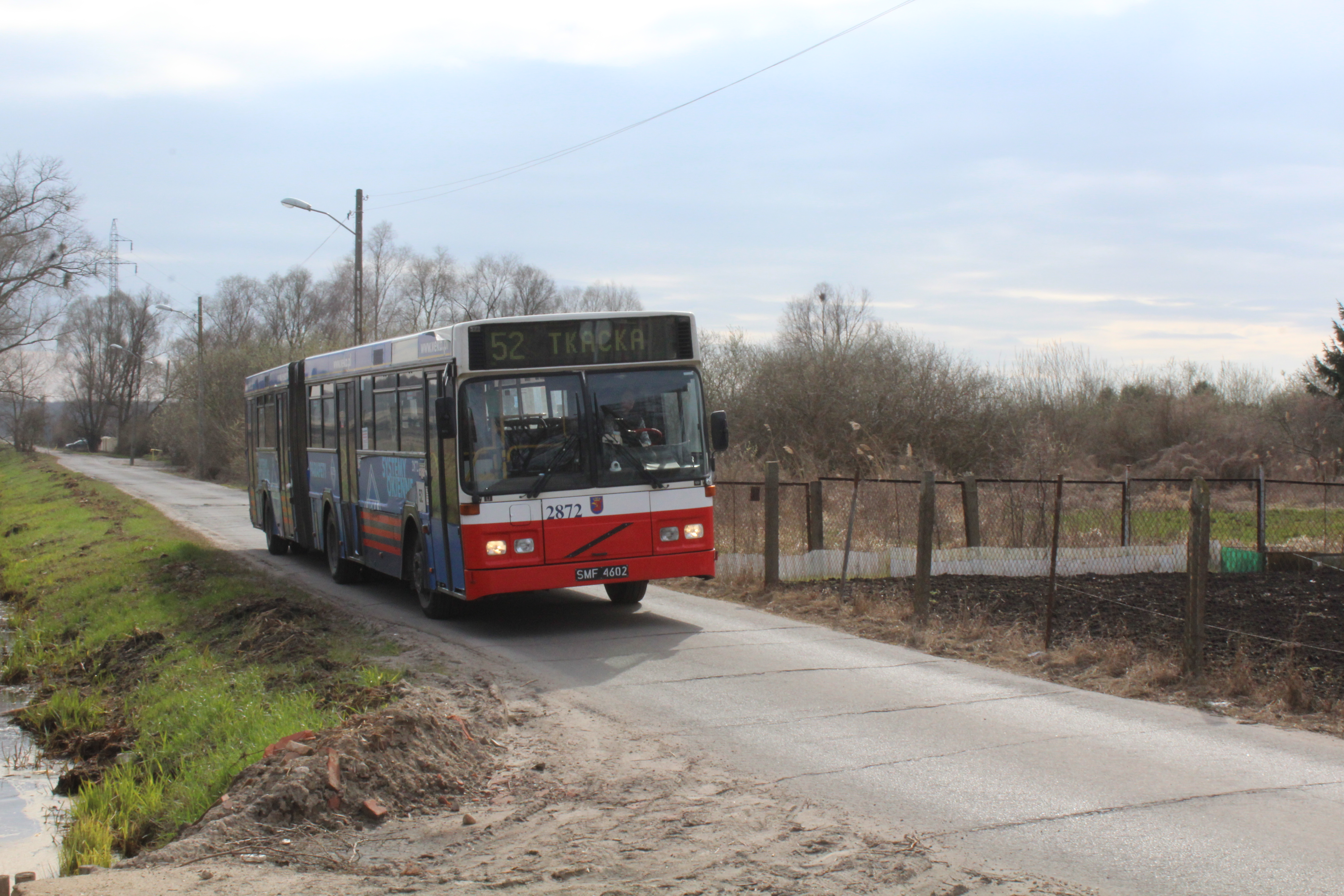
- Top: Gdyński Boulevard, Leona Heyki Street; Middle: Grodzka Island, Energetyków Street; Bottom: Lastadia Office and Customs House, Marynarska Street

- Location of Międzyodrze-Wyspa Pucka within Szczecin
- Coordinates: 53°24′N 14°34′E
- Country: Poland
- Voivodeship: West Pomeranian
- County/City: Szczecin

Population (2011)
  - Total: 1,098
- Time zone: UTC+1 (CET)
  - Summer (DST): UTC+2 (CEST)
- Area code: +48 91
- Car plates: ZS

Międzyodrze-Wyspa Pucka is a municipal neighbourhood of the city of Szczecin, Poland situated on the islands between the West Oder river and East Oder River (Regalica), south-east of the Szczecin Old Town, and west of Szczecin-Dąbie. As of January 2011 it had a population of 1,098.

== See also ==
- Międzyodrze
