= Hilde Radusch =

German politician (1903–1994)

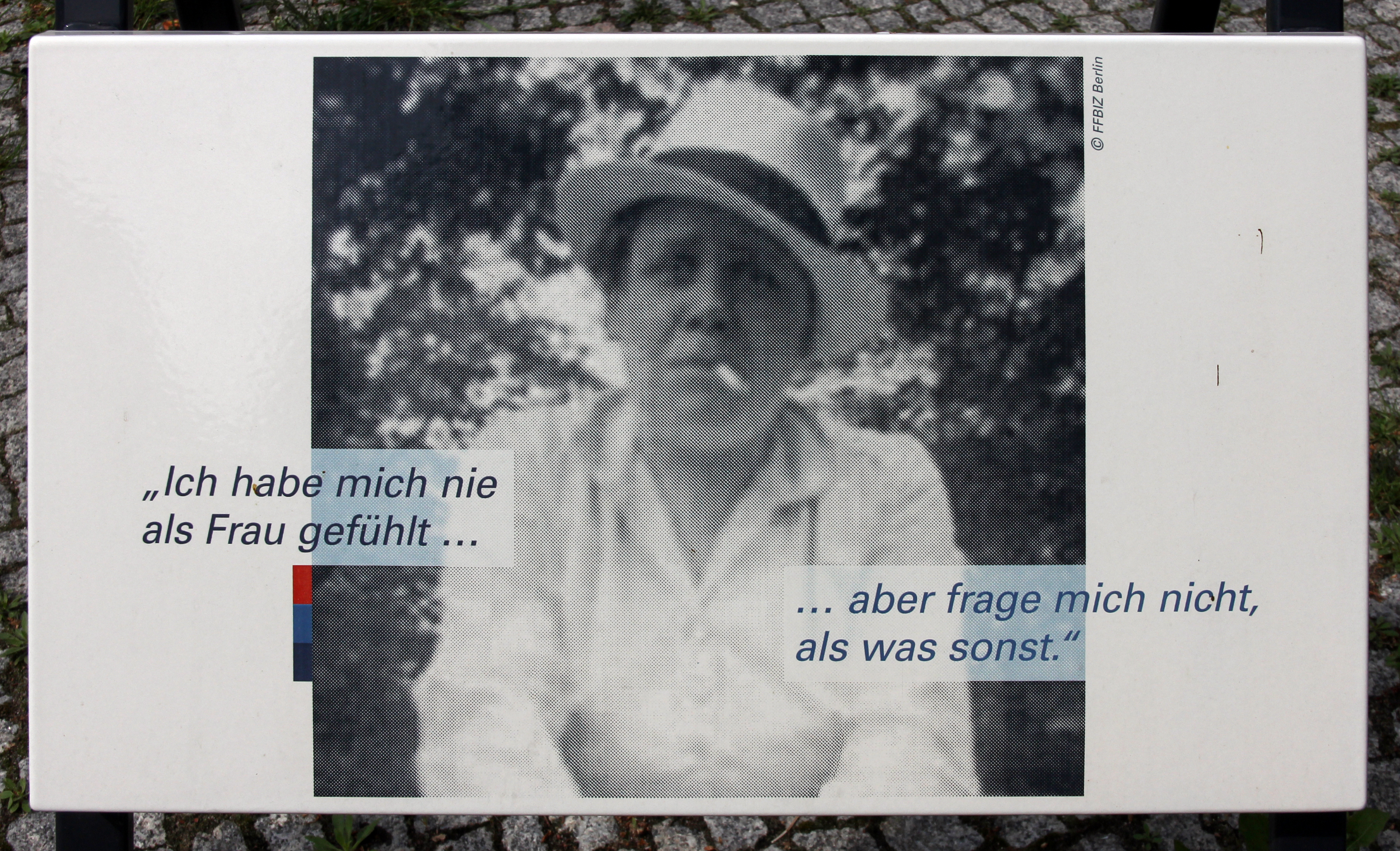
Memorial tablet to Hilde Radusch at Eisenacher Straße 15, Berlin-Schöneberg

Hilde Radusch (6 November 1903 – 2 August 1994) was a German political activist (KPD, SPD) who became involved in anti-fascist resistance. As the 20th century progressed, she became increasingly prominent as a feminist and lesbian activist.

Throughout her life Radusch kept a diary. Accessed by researchers after she died, her own writings have provided an insightful, and at times engagingly laconic, commentary on her eventful life.

== Life ==
Hilde Radusch was born in Altdamm, directly across the river from Stettin, but the family moved while she was still young to Weimar in central southern Germany.

Added info: Her birth name is rarely seen in US publications. She was born Hildegard Auguste Adelaide Marie, on November 6, 1903, in Altdamm near Stettin, the daughter of Gertrud Radusch (née Brucks; 1896–1944)—a housewife—and Adolf Radusch (1875–1915). She grew up in this bourgeois-conservative home and, beginning in 1913, attended the Lyceum in Aschersleben.Meta Frauenbewegungsgeschichten. Gemeinsam suchen, gemeinsam finden.

Her father was a postal worker who in 1915 was killed in the First World War, but by that time he had instilled in his daughter a spirit of independence and determination which made for a sometimes difficult relationship with her widowed mother during her teenage years. When she was 18 Radusch left home and headed for Berlin where she gained a training place at the Pestalozzi-Fröbel Training Institute. She emerged in 1922 with a qualification in infant care and education.

1922 was the year in which she joined the Young Communists. By 1924, together with Hedwig Remmele, she was taking a lead in the recently founded Berlin Red Women's and Girls' Association ("Roten Frauen- und Mädchenbunde"), also writing articles for the movement's newspaper, "Die Frauenwacht" ("Women Watch"). However, finding no employment opportunities for communists in infant care, she took a job in 1923 as a telephone switchboard operator with the post office. It was while working for the post office that Radusch met Maria, described in one source as "her first girl friend", and at some point the two of them moved in together. Radusch continued working for the post office till 1930.

On her first full-time job, as a post office telephonist

"It was a respectable job, not too well paid, but nevertheless, as we thought, a job for life."
"Es war eine respektable Arbeit, nicht aufregend viel Geld, aber etwas fürs ganze Leben, so dachten wir jedenfalls."

Hilde Radusch (as quoted by Claudia Schoppmann)

On the breakup with her "first girlfriend" in 1933

"Our liaison had to end, because suddenly Maria hated communists."
"Aus unserer Verbindung konnte dann nichts mehr werden, denn Maria hasste plötzlich die Kommunisten."

Hilde Radusch (as quoted by Claudia Schoppmann)

In 1924, she had joined the Communist Party, and from 1929 till 1932, Radusch served as a Communist Party city councillor in Berlin. In 1932 she was no longer listed as a communist candidate for the city council elections, due to the scandalising impact of her disinclination to conceal her lesbian private life.

In 1931, Radusch joined the Communist party's alternative "special" postal workers' trades union. The copies of her reports imply a belief in Moscow that she could possess expertise that would be helpful to the development of a Soviet postal service. In September 1932, she traveled to the Soviet Union as part of a delegation from the German communist party, "visiting the Soviet postal operation". Along with Moscow, the visit, which lasted several months, took in Leningrad and Odessa. In January 1933 the political backdrop was transformed when the Nazi Party took power and converted Germany into a one-party dictatorship. Political activity - except in support of the Nazi Party - became illegal. At the end of February 1933, the Reichstag fire instantly was blamed on the Communists, and in March 1933 those identified as Communists began to be arrested. At the end of March 1933, Radusch moved out of the home she was sharing with her partner Maria in order to protect the latter's position. Maria still was working for the post office, which made her a "public servant": they thought her employment would be imperilled if she was living in sin with a former communist city councillor.

On being taken into "protective custody" in 1933

"In a certain sense we became heroes, because by being arrested by the Nazis we were 'recognised' as political opponents."
"In gewisser Weise kamen wir uns als Helden vor, weil wir durch die Haft von den Nazis als politische Gegner 'anerkannt' wurden."

Hilde Radusch (as quoted by Claudia Schoppmann)

On love in a prison cell in 1933

"Love in prison is not fun. Next to our cell was the sitting room of the prison officers. A loud utterance in the silence of the night, or a sigh, meant 'the cellar', which was a bunker with extra punishment and solitary confinement."
"Ein Vergnügen ist die Liebe in Gefangenschaft nicht. Neben unserer Zelle war der Aufenthaltsraum der Beamtin. Ein lautes Wort in der völlig stillen Nacht, ein Seufzer hätte Keller, das heißt Bunker mit Strafverschärfung und Einzelhaft bedeutet."

Hilde Radusch (as quoted by Claudia Schoppmann)

Radusch was home from the Soviet Union by March 1933, and at 6 in the morning on 6 April 1933, the authorities arrested her in connection with her Communist Party and other "resistance" activities. She was invited to sign an inaccurate record of her initial interrogation, which amounted to a confession of guilt. When she refused to sign, she was informed by her Gestapo interrogators that she would be taken into "protective custody" ("Schutzhaft"). She was taken, in the first instance, to the police station in Alexanderplatz where she was one of 36 women placed in a room. Two of the detainees at once announced that they were masseuses and started to massage one another but quickly were separated. After a month, she ended up in the Barnim Street women's prison, along with around 200 other "politicals". Unlike those identified as "criminals", the "politicals" were not held in solitary confinement. An affair with a cellmate made the detention easier to endure, but being allocated a thin-walled cell positioned next to the warders' sitting room was in some respects inhibiting.

At the end of September 1933, she was released with a number of the other detainees identified as "politicals" and moved to central Berlin, where she was placed under Gestapo surveillance. Her political history made it hard to find work, but she found a job with Siemens, where she was able to pursue her "illegal party work" inside the company.

In 1939, she met Else "Eddy" Klopsch who became her life partner. One of Eddy's many achievements was winning the confidence of Radusch's mother, who approved of her daughter "settling down". From 1941, Hilde and Eddy ran a little restaurant. Initially their application for a restaurant license was refused under pressure from the local SS (The Nazi party's quasi-military wing), which deemed Radusch "politically unreliable", but eventually they found premises and established a "shop", registered in the name of Mr Klopsch (Eddy's father). The business was located in Berlin's Scheunen quarter and contained much furniture suitable for the restaurant, which had been left behind by the previous occupants. Like many premises in the Scheunen quarter, their shop had been owned by Jews who had moved. They never did obtain official permission to run the shop as a restaurant. However, all shops in the neighbourhood were required to display a "Forbidden to Jews" ("Für Juden verboten!") sign in the window, and in Mr Klopsch's shop window, in front of this sign, was placed, without explanation, a restaurant menu. The restaurant later became a refuge for "illegals" when the underground Communist Party leadership resumed contact with Radusch and started sending her women released from detention to be hidden and looked after. Radusch and Klopsch did not always succeed in these difficult tasks: They were unable to save Henny Lemberg, a Jewish Communist entrusted to their care and whom they befriended, from being deported to an extermination camp.

The attempt to assassinate Hitler on 20 July 1944 failed in its primary objective, but it did greatly unsettle the Nazi leadership. Some years earlier, the Nazis had compiled a list of communist and socialist politicians and activists from the Weimar years who might be rounded up in the event of a deterioration in the domestic political situation. By 1944, the list was somewhat out of date, many of those named on it having been murdered or died from natural causes, but Hilde Radusch, whose name was also on the list, was alive, and by this stage, working in a bank. The mass roundup of political opponents was implemented overnight on 22/23 August 1944. Fortunately Eddy Klopsch had a friend in the police service who warned the women of the government's intentions, and they were able to escape in time to avoid capture. They spent the rest of the war hiding in a large allotment shed in Prieros, a hamlet set in marshy countryside between Berlin and Cottbus, that was for most purposes far from the beaten track, and where they had purchased a piece of land when first they got together in 1940. They had used it in 1943 to hide Erna Hackbarth, the partner of Richard Stahlmann, after she had managed to escape from a concentration camp. However, they had to survive in it themselves without any ration coupons. There were occasions when Radusch managed to exchange a bed sheet for meat. They sometimes were able to find wood for heating themselves in the woods, and they learned to concoct a tobacco substitute from blackberries. Nevertheless, by the time Berlin was liberated by the Red army in April/May 1945, they were starving.

Doubts about The Party in 1945

"Can you reach the goal of Socialism along a bad totalitarian road? Does the end really justify the means?"
"Kann man das Ziel des Sozialismus auf einem schlechten, totalitären Weg erreichen? Heiligt wirklich der Zweck die Mittel?"

Hilde Radusch (as quoted by Claudia Schoppmann)

On her exclusion from The Party in 1946

"It really put an end to all illusions ... part of [my] life's dream was destroyed"
"Es war wirklich das Ende aller Illusionen ... ein Stück Lebenstraum war zerbrochen."

Hilde Radusch (as quoted by Claudia Schoppmann)

The end of the war found the entire central portion of what had been Germany administered as the Soviet occupation zone. Radusch threw herself into the vast reconstruction effort. From June 1945 to February 1946, she was employed in the district "Victims of Fascism" department for the district government of Schöneberg, processing claims for emergency food and clothing. In 1946, she was a co-instigator of a "child rescue" ("Rettet die Kinder") project. At the same time, seeing Soviet communism arriving in Germany with the Red army, she began to nurture doubts about the Communist Party, which had been the focus of her politics for more than 20 years. She took a decision to resign from it and made her intention known. In January 1946 the local party leadership anticipated her resignation and expelled her, using her lesbian relationship to justify the move. She was bombarded with threatening letters and denounced her to her employers at the town hall. When she went to see her boss to clarify matters, she found a thick personnel file, containing statements from three leading communists, denouncing her as a lesbian, for which reason she no longer should be employed in a public office. The comrades had their way, and in February 1946, she lost her job. Wartime deprivation had taken its toll, and by now, she was suffering from Rheumatoid arthritis. A few years later, she was forced to take early retirement, supported by a meagre pension.

In 1948, she joined the by now, within the Soviet occupation zone, badly emaciated Social Democratic Party (SPD). Her partner Eddy, six years younger than she, had been physically handicapped before they met, her condition sufficient to justify a small disability pension. Eddy bought a bric-à-brac shop. Despite the poor health from which they both suffered, the shop supported the two of them till 1960 when Eddy died of cancer. Bereavement hit Hilde Radusch hard.

The 1970s brought a new wave of feminism, and Radusch joined in. She co-founded L74, a Berlin group of older lesbians. She became an editor on Our Little Newspaper (Unserer Kleinen Zeitung /UKZ), described by one source as the first lesbian newspaper after the Second World War. A few years later she was a co-founder of the Women's Research, Education and Information Centre (Frauenforschungs-, -bildungs- und -informationszentrum / FFBIZ).

In 2012, a memorial was set up at the corner of Eisenacher Straße (Eisenach Street) and Winterfeldtstraße (Winterfeld Street), consisting of three tablets dedicated to her. It is the first public memorial in Berlin commemorating a lesbian victim of Nazi persecution.
