= Kraśnica, Szczecin =

Neighbourhood of Szczecin, Poland

Kraśnica
- Neighbourhood
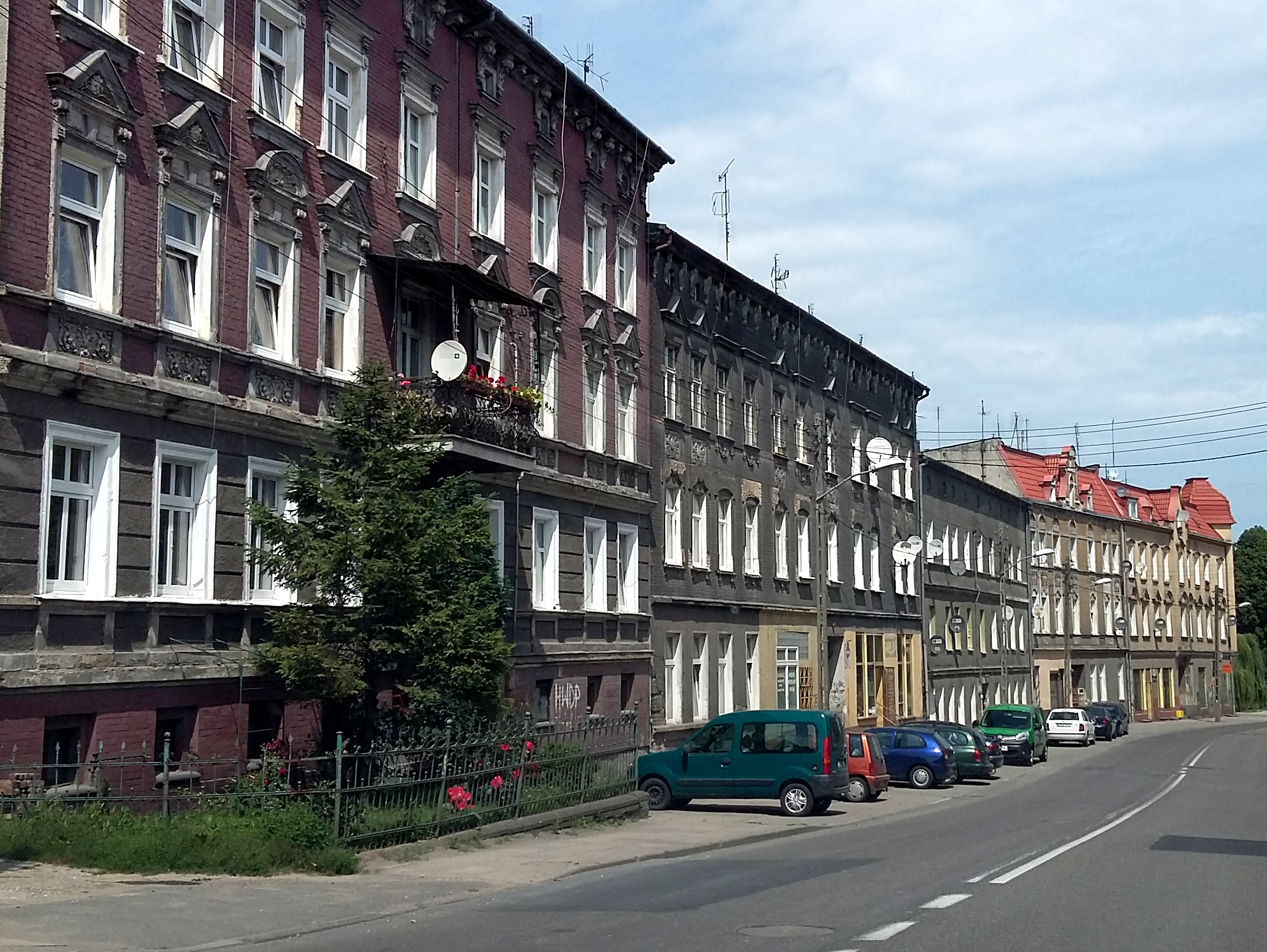
- The tenement houses on Nad Odrą Street.
- Interactive map of Kraśnica
- Coordinates: 53.493759°N 14.6130303°E
- Country: Poland
- Voivodeship: West Pomeranian
- City and county: Szczecin
- District: North
- Administrative neighbourhood: Stołczyn
- Time zone: UTC+1 (CET)
  - Summer (DST): UTC+2 (CEST)
- Area code: +48 91
- Car plates: ZS

Kraśnica (Polish pronunciation: [kraɕˈni.t͡sa]; German until 1945: Kratzwieck [ˈkʁats.viːk]) is a neighbourhood of Szczecin, Poland, located within the North district, in the eastern portion of the administrative subdivision of Stołczyn. It is a loosely-urbanised area with apartment buildings, and industrial buildings. It is placed in the area of Kościelna and Nad Odrą Streets, on the coast of the West Oder river. The neighbourhood features the Szczecin Stołczyn railway station. In the late 19th century, the village of Kraśnica developed into an industrial area, which at the beginning of the 20th century, formed a cojoined agglomeration with the nearby villages of Glinki and Stołczyn. It was incorporated into the city of Szczecin in 1939.

== History ==
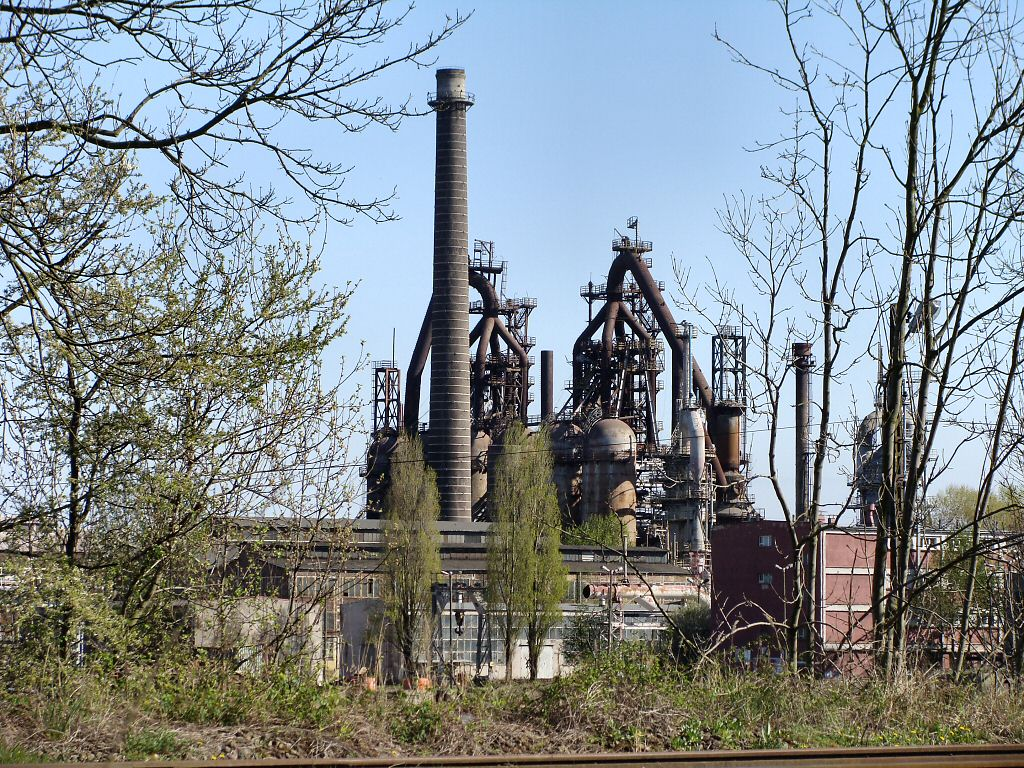
The Huta Szczecin ironworks in Kraśnica, opened in 1897 and demolished in 2009.

In the 19th century, Glinki (German: Kratzwieck) was village located in the area of the current Nad Odrą and Kościelna Streets, on the coast of the West Oder river. At the beginning of the 20th century, it developed into an inustrial area, it formed one conjoined agglomeration with the nearby villages of Glinki (Glienken) and Stołczyn (Stolzenhagen).

In 1897, the Kraft ironworks was founded at the current 10 Nad Odrą Street in Kraśnica, being owned by Guido Henckel von Donnersmarck, a nobleman, industrial magnate, and one of the wealthiest people in the world at the time. In 1945, it became a state-owned enterprise of the Polish government, under the name Huta Szczecin (lit. 'Szczecin Ironworks'). In 1996, it became a private company. It was closed down in 2008, and demolished in 2009.

In 1898, the Szczecin Stołczyn railway station, originally named Stolzenhagen-Kratzwieck was opened on the current Kolejowa Street in Kraśnica, as part of the line between Szczecin Main Station and Trzebież. It was electrified in 1982.

On 15 October 1939, Kraśnica was incorporated into the city of Szczecin. It was captured by the Red Army of the Soviet Union on 26 April 1945 during the Second World War. The city was placed under the Polish administration on 5 July 1945, while its suburbs, including Kraśnica, were placed under the Soviet military occupation The neighbourhood became part of the Police Enclave, an area of the occupation, which while officially part of the territory of Poland, was administrated as part of the Randow District in the Soviet occupation zone in Germany. It was created to facilitate the removal of the machinery and resources of the Hydrierwerke Pölitz AG factory in the nearby Police, and its transportation to the Soviet Union. Over 20,000 workers and prisoners of war from Germany worked on the project in the Police Enclave, while Polish population was not allowed to settle in the area. Its southern portion, including Kraśnica, was abolished on 19 July 1946, and subsequently incorporated into the city. Following the end of the conflict, the German population either fled or was expelled from Szczecin, and was replaced by Polish settlers, who begun moving in to Kraśnica following its incorporation. In 1945, the neighbourhood, previously known in German as Kratzwieck, became known by Polish population as Kraszewsko (Polish: [kraˈʂɛf.skɔ]), and was later officially renamed in 1946 to its current name of Kraśnica.

From 1955 to 1976, Kraśnica was part of the neighbourhood of Glinki-Stołczyn, which formed one of the administrative subdivisions of the Nad Odrą district. On 28 November 1990, the neighbourhood of Stołczyn was established as one of the administrative subdivisions of the North district, being governed by an elected neighbourhood council, incorporating the area of Kraśnica.

== Characteristics ==
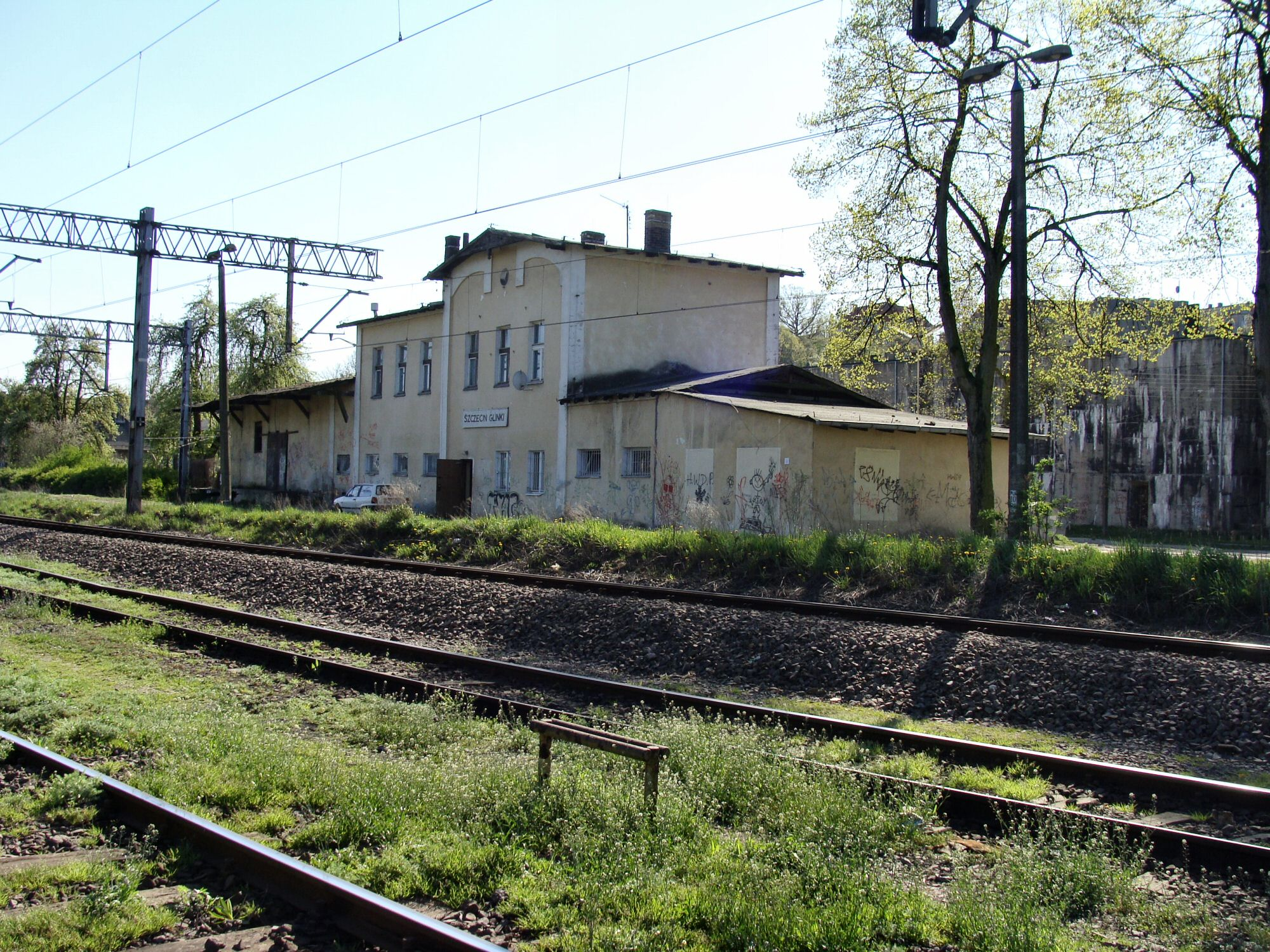
The Szczecin Stołczyn railway station in Kraśnica.

Kraśnica is a loosely-urbanised residential area with apartment buildings. It is placed in the area of Kościelan and Nad Odrą Streets, on the coast of the West Oder river. It also includes industrial buildings. The neighborhood features the Szczecin Stołczyn railway station, placed on Kolejowa Street, which forms a part the line between Szczecin Main Station and Trzebież.
