= Voivodeship road 114 =

Road in Poland

Voivodeship Road 114
- Droga wojewódzka nr 114

Route information
- Maintained by Zachodnio Pomorski Zarząd Dróg Wojewódzkich
- Length: 42 km (26 mi)

Major junctions
- From: Nowe Warpno
- To: Tanowo

Location
- Country: Poland
- Regions: West Pomeranian Voivodeship
- Major cities: Police

Highway system
- National roads in Poland; Voivodeship roads
← DW 113	→ DW 115

Voivodeship road 114 (Polish: Droga wojewódzka nr 114, abbreviated DW 114) is a route in the Polish voivodeship roads network. The route links Nowe Warpno with the Voivodeship Road 115 in Tanowo.

== Route plan ==
km	Icon	Name	Crossed roads
0		Nowe Warpno	—
3		Karszyno	—
7		Warnołęka	—
11		Brzózki	—
20		Trzebież	—
22		Level crossing for railway line Police - Trzebież	—
25		Uniemyśl	—
25		Level crossing for railway line Police - Trzebież	—
25		Niekłończyca	—
28		Dębostrów	—
29		Jasienica	—
35		Police	—
35		Level crossing for railway line Police - Trzebież	—
38		Trzeszczyn	—
42		Tanowo	
x		Szczecin	—
x		Dobieszczyn	—
