= Międzyodrze =

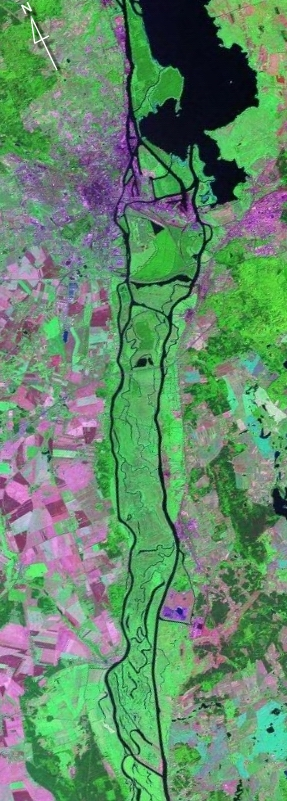
Międzyodrze

Międzyodrze is an area in Poland located in the Lower Odra Valley between two branches of the Oder River: West Oder and East Oder, a segment from the village Widuchowa to Iński Nurt channel. Międzyodrze area also includes islands located between the Oder, its anabranch Cegielinka and Dąbie Lake, as well as part of Szczecin.

== Polders ==
The historical polders are in the Międzyodrze area. They present a unique idea of regulation of the Oder and protection of the Szczecin from seasonal floods. Middleoder Polders were formed from 1849 to 1932 (Lower Cedynia/Zehden Polder, 1849–58 and Upper Polder, 1906–32). The polders include 33 kilometres (21 mi) of canals, 177 kilometres (110 mi) of levees, and 129 hydrotechnical structures. Since 1993, the Lower Odra Valley Landscape Park is located there. Structures allow water to flow freely through extensive floodplains. This protects the whole region from flooding.

== See also ==
- Międzyodrze-Wyspa Pucka
