= Cegielinka =

Coordinates: 53°23′10″N 14°37′04″E

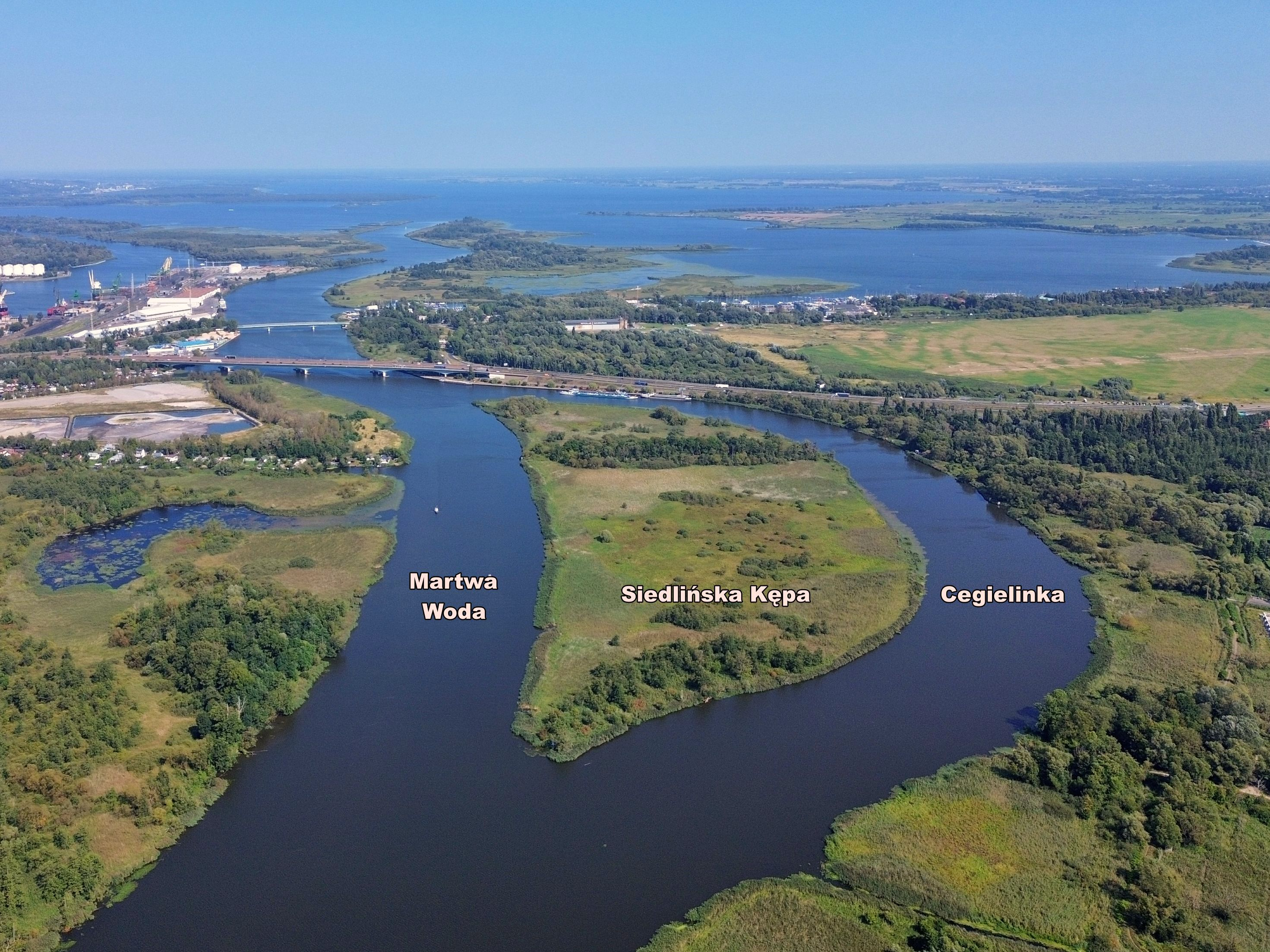

Location
- Country: Poland

Cegielinka is a river of Poland, an anabranch of the East Oder near Zdroje, Szczecin.
