= Voivodeship road 115 =

Road in Poland

Voivodeship Road 115
- Droga wojewódzka nr 115

Route information
- Maintained by Zachodnio Pomorski Zarząd Dróg Wojewódzkich
- Length: 30.9 km (19.2 mi)

Location
- Country: Poland
- Regions: West Pomeranian Voivodeship
- Major cities: Szczecin

Highway system
- National roads in Poland; Voivodeship roads
← DW 114	→ DW 116

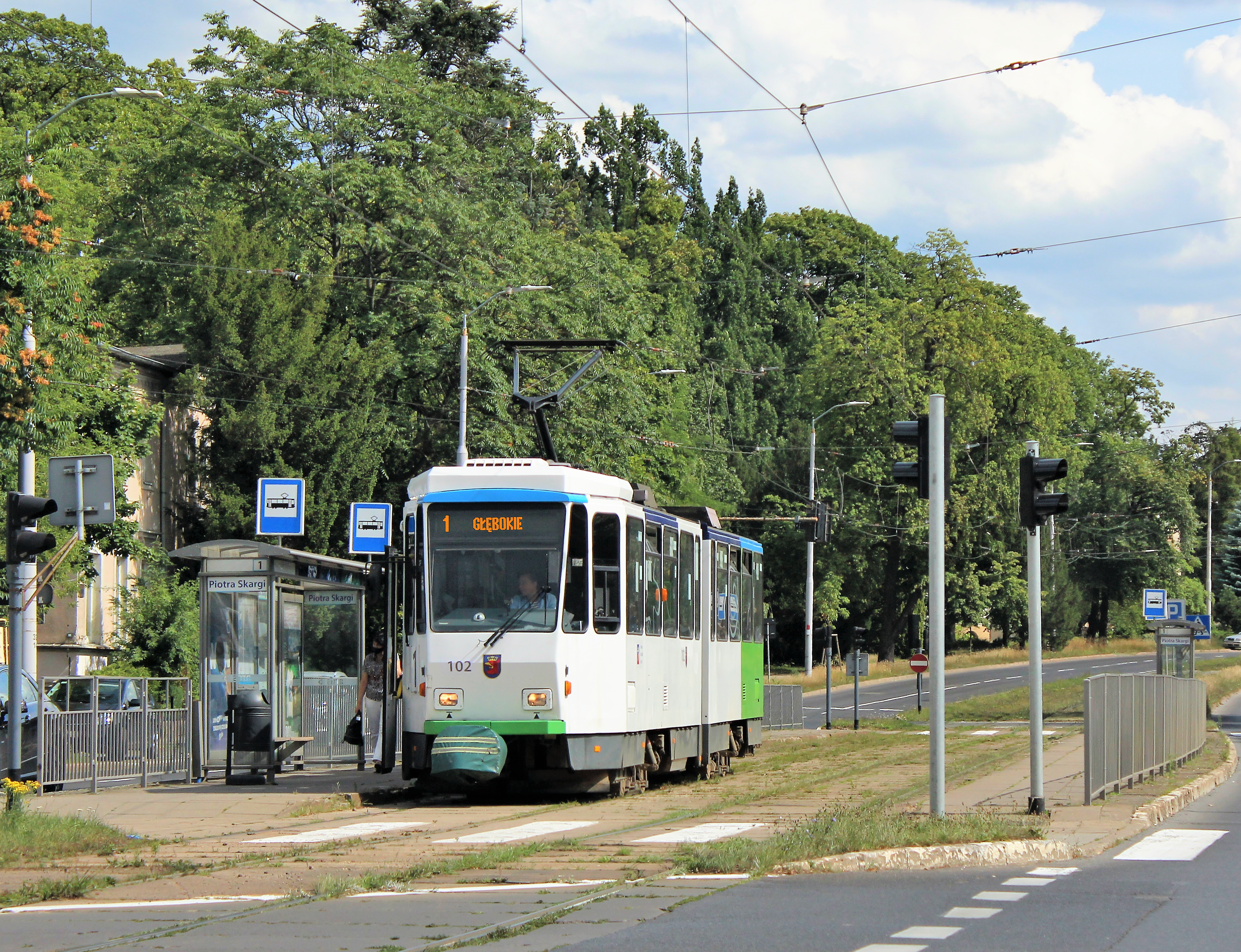
Voivodeship Road 115 in Szczecin, Wojska Polskiego Avenue

Voivodeship Road 115 (Polish: Droga wojewódzka nr 115, abbreviated DW 115) is a route in the Polish voivodeship roads network. On 5 June 2008 the route allowed access with Germany by the border crossing Dobieszczyn - Hintersee and the route was added 900 metres to be able to join with the border.

== Important settlements along the route ==
- Szczecin
- Tanowo
- Dobieszczyn

== Route plan ==
km	Icon	Name	Crossed roads
0		Szczecin - Gdańska Road	
0.7		Szczecin - Bridge over the river Parnica	—
1.2		Szczecin - Highway over the river Łasztownia	—
2.1		Szczecin - Bridge over the river Oder	—
2.2		Szczecin - Jana z Kolna Road and ul. Nabrzeże Wieleckie Road	—
3.5		Szczecin - Mazurska Road Petrol station (PKN Orlen)	—
5.4		Szczecin - Wojska Polskiego Highway and Gorkiego Road Petrol station (PKN Orlen)	—
5.7		Szczecin - Wojska Polskiego Highway Petrol station (Shell)	—
7.1		Szczecin - Wojska Polskiego Highway and Unii Lubelskiej Road Petrol station (BP)	—
14.1		Pilchowo	—
19.9		Tanowo	
30.9		Dobieszczyn	—
x		Border crossing Dobieszczyn — Hintersee	—
x		Germany	—
