= Łasztownia =

Neighbourhood of Szczecin, Poland

Coordinates: 53°25′20″N 14°34′40″E

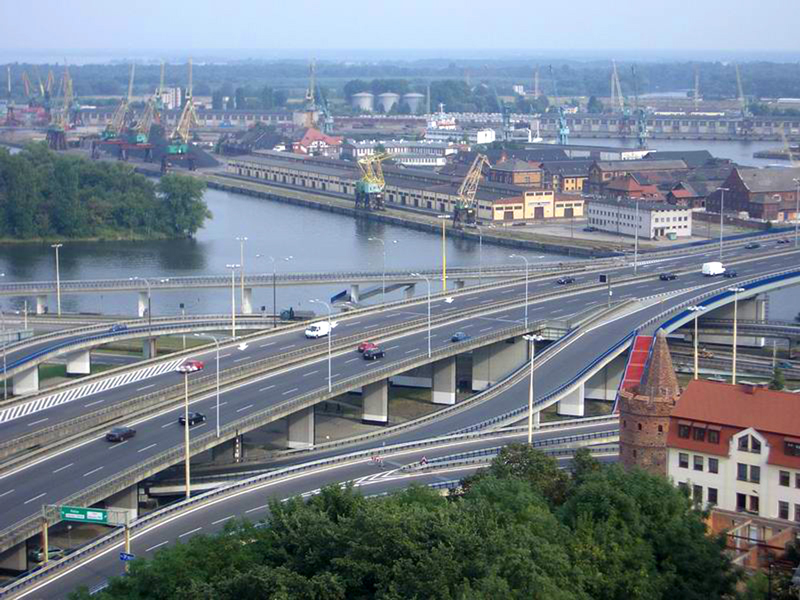
View of Łasztownia from the Ducal Castle

Łasztownia is a part of the Szczecin City, Poland situated on the islands between the West Oder river and East Oder River (Regalica), east of the Szczecin Old Town, and west of Szczecin-Dąbie.
