= Claudia Schoppmann =

German historian and author (born 1958)

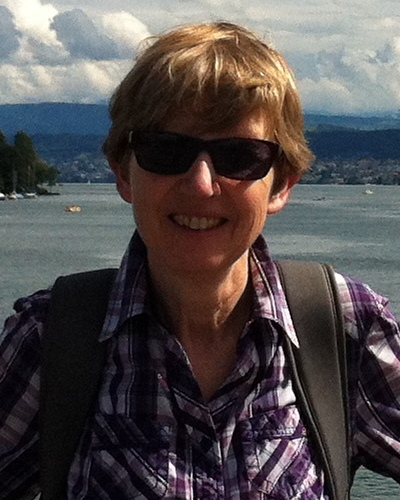
Claudia Schoppmann, at Lake Zurich, 2014

Claudia Schoppmann (born 17 February 1958, in Stuttgart) is a German historian and author.

Schoppmann studied history, communication studies and the German language, first at University of Münster and later at university in West Berlin. In 1990, Schoppmann finished her university studies with work on Nationalsozialistische Sexualpolitik und weibliche Homosexualität ("The position of lesbian women in the Nazi period").

Schoppmann has written several books on LGBT topics.

== Awards ==
- "Rosa Courage"-prize; Osnabrück (1997)

== Works (in German) ==
- Nationalsozialistische Sexualpolitik und weibliche Homosexualität. (1991/1997) ISBN 3-89085-538-5
- Im Fluchtgepäck die Sprache - Deutschsprachige Schriftstellerinnen im Exil. (1991/1995) ISBN 3-596-12318-6
- Zeit der Maskierung - Lebensgeschichten lesbischer Frauen im "Dritten Reich". (1993/1998) ISBN 3-596-13573-7
- Nach der Shoa geboren. Jüdische Frauen in Deutschland. (2001) ISBN 3-88520-529-7
- Verbotene Verhältnisse. (1999) ISBN 3-89656-038-7
- Der Skorpion. Frauenliebe in der Weimarer Republik. ISBN 3-89656-038-7
- Der homosexuellen NS-Opfer gedenken. (1999) ISBN 3-927760-36-6
- Ich fürchte die Menschen mehr als die Bomben. Aus den Tagebüchern von drei Berliner Frauen 1938-1946. (1996) ISBN 3-926893-30-3
- 1930-1950 Zeitzeugen aus Demokratie und Diktatur. Leben zwischen Anpassung und Widerstand. (2002) ISBN 3-930998-25-4
