= Dobieszczyn =

- Settlement
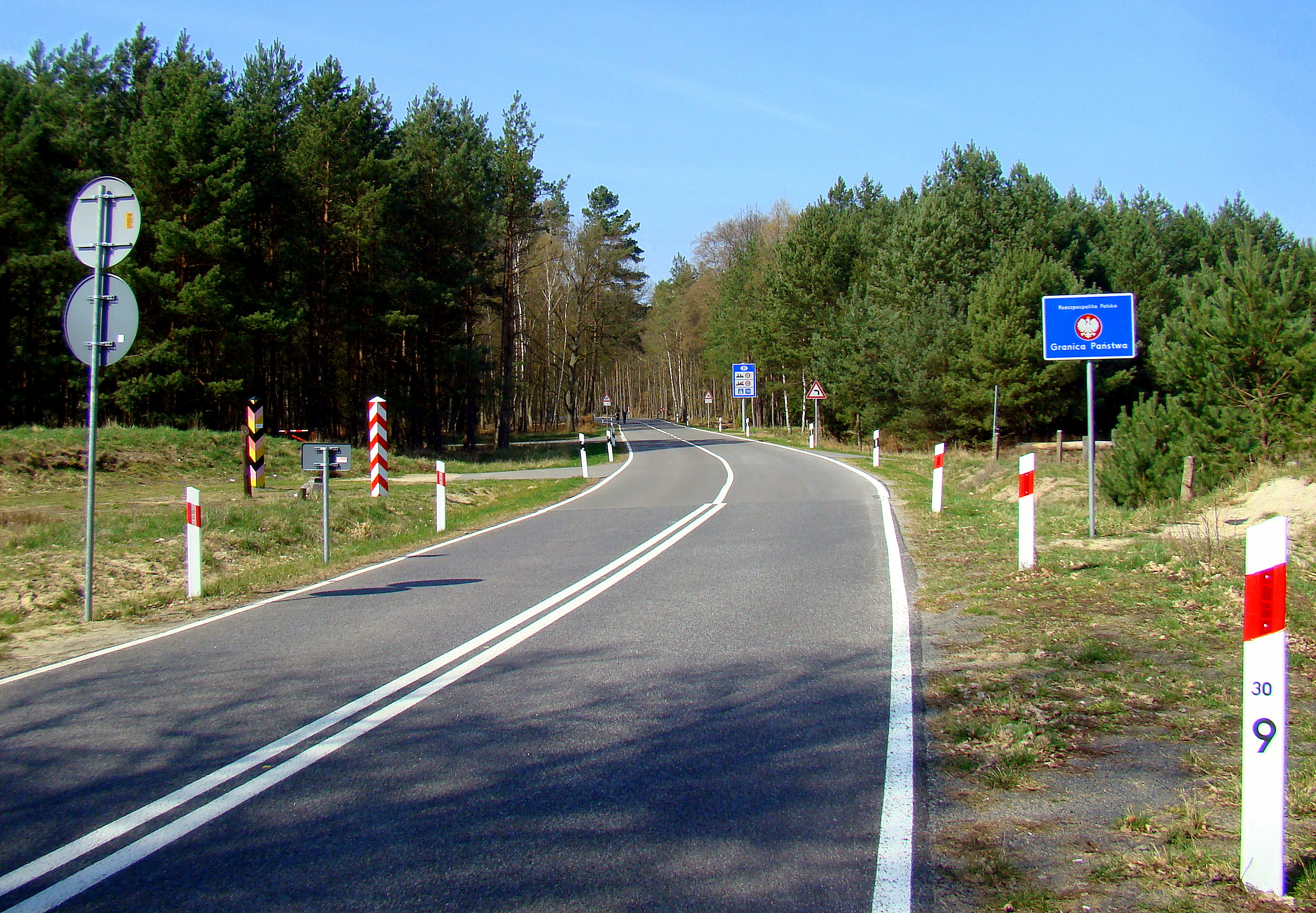
- Germany-Poland border near Dobieszczyn

- Location within Poland
- Coordinates: 53°36′1″N 14°19′59″E
- Country: Poland
- Voivodeship: West Pomeranian
- County: Police
- Gmina: Police
- Population: 5
- Time zone: UTC+1 (CET)
  - Summer (DST): UTC+2 (CEST)
- Vehicle registration: ZPL
- Primary airport: Solidarity Szczecin–Goleniów Airport

Dobieszczyn [dɔˈbjɛʂt͡ʂɨn] (German: Entepöl) is a settlement in the administrative district of Gmina Police, within Police County, West Pomeranian Voivodeship, in north-western Poland, close to the German border. It lies approximately 18 km (11 mi) north-west of Police and 27 km (17 mi) north-west of the regional capital Szczecin.

== History ==
Since the Middle Ages the area was part of Poland and the Duchy of Pomerania following Poland's fragmentation. There is a memorial to Duke Barnim II nearby, on the German side of the border, in the place where he was probably assassinated in 1295. During the Thirty Years' War, the duchy was dissolved and the area fell to Sweden. From 1815 it was part of Prussia and from 1871 also Germany, within which it was known as Entepöl and was administratively located in the Province of Pomerania. Following the defeat of Nazi Germany in World War II in 1945 the area became again part of Poland; however, the settlement was initially occupied by the Soviets until October 1945. Administratively it was part of the Szczecin Voivodeship, since 1999 the West Pomeranian Voivodeship.

The border was opened to free travel in 2008, after Poland joined the Schengen Agreement.

The name of the settlement comes from the Old Polish male name Dobiesław.

== Demography ==
Historic population of the settlement:

- 1864 – 13
- 1939 – 4
- 2001 – 5

== Transport ==
The Voivodeship road 115 runs through the village, and connects it with the nearby city of Szczecin.

== Tourism ==
- Bicycle trail (red Trail "Puszcza Wkrzańska"-Szlak "Puszcza Wkrzańska") in an area of Dobieszczyn in Wkrzanska Forest

== See also ==
- Police
- Szczecin
