= Dąbie (lake) =

Lake in Szczecin, West Pomeranian Voivodeship, Poland

Dąbie Lake
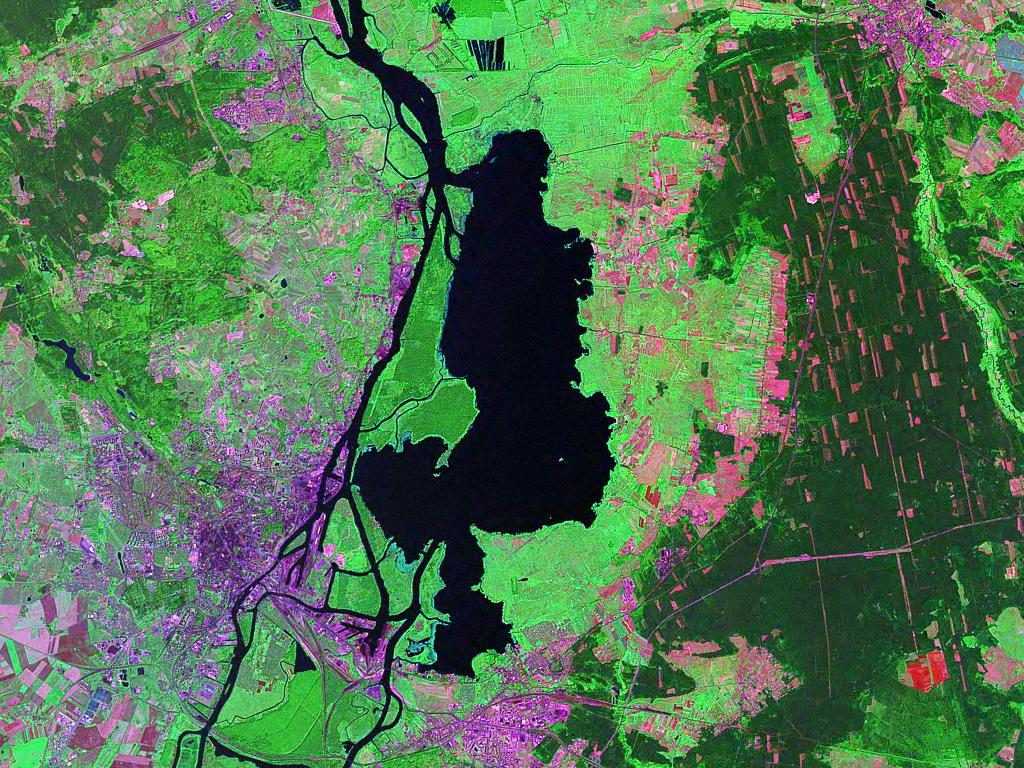
- Lake view from satellite

- Location within West Pomeranian Voivodeship
- Location: West Pomeranian Voivodeship
- Coordinates: 53°27′57″N 14°39′11″E
- Basin countries: Poland
- Surface area: 56 km^{2} (22 sq mi)
- Average depth: 3.0–3.5 m (9.8–11.5 ft)
- Max. depth: 8 m (26 ft)

Dąbie (Polish: Dąbie or Jezioro Dąbskie, German: Dammscher See) is a lake in the delta of the Oder in northwestern Poland at Szczecin. To the South of the lake lies the Szczecin suburban district also called Dąbie and lake Dąbie Małe.

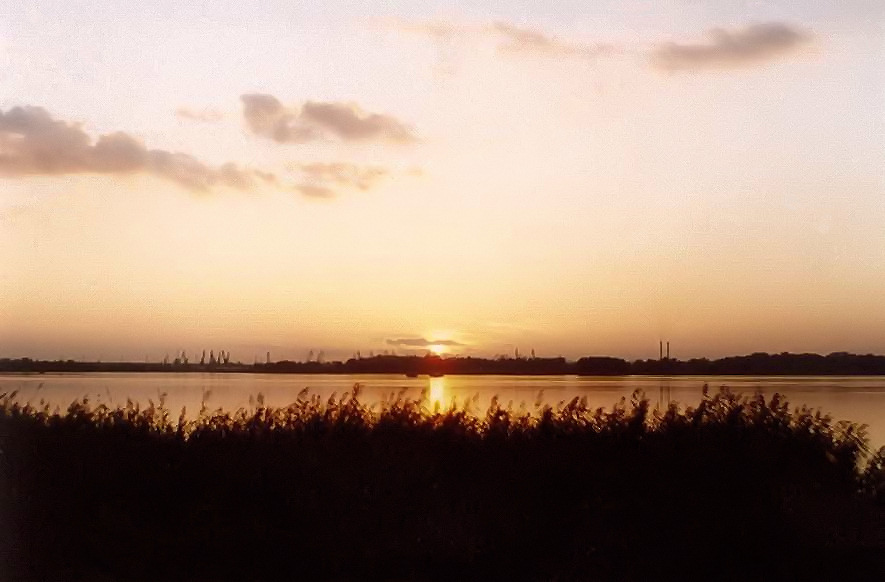
Dąbie Lake

== See also ==
West Oder
