= East Oder =

River in Poland

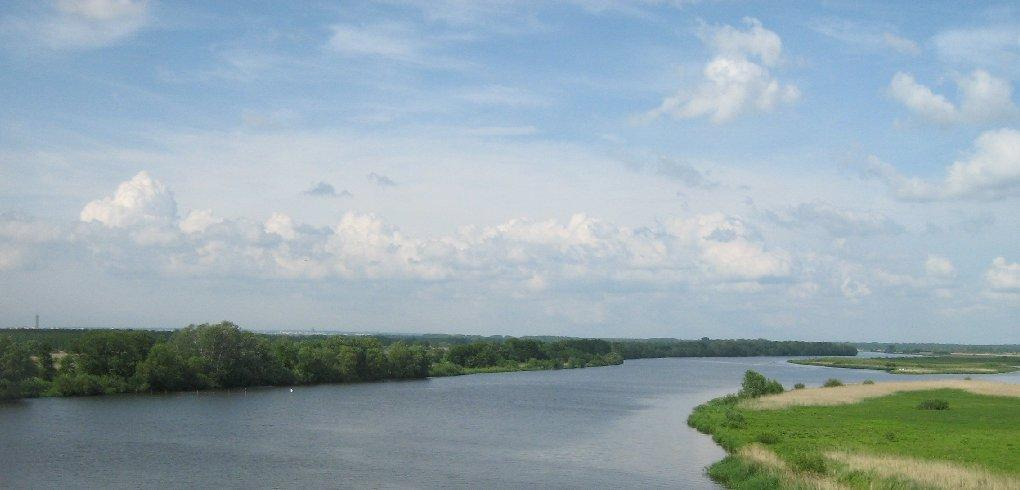
- Mouth of East Oder on the map of Poland

Location
- Country: Poland

Physical characteristics
- Mouth: Dąbie Lake
  - coordinates: 53.4307°N 14.6335°E
- Length: 26.4 km (16.4 mi)

Basin features
- Progression: Dąbie Lake→ Oder→ Baltic Sea

East Oder (Polish: Odra Wschodnia) is the eastern arm of the lower Oder near Szczecin, Poland. It flows through Skośnica canal into West Oder and through Regalica into Dąbie Lake in the delta of the Oder river.

The river flows through the Lower Oder Valley forming, along with the Western Oder (Polish: Odra Zachodnia), an area called Międzyodrze, part of the Lower Odra Valley Landscape Park. The Międzyodrze area is traversed by a network of canals and old riverbeds, linked with East Oder. Between the split of Odra arms to the Regalica, East Oder runs through the Gryfino County.

== See also ==
- West Oder
