= Dąbie, Szczecin =

Dąbie
- Municipal neighbourhood
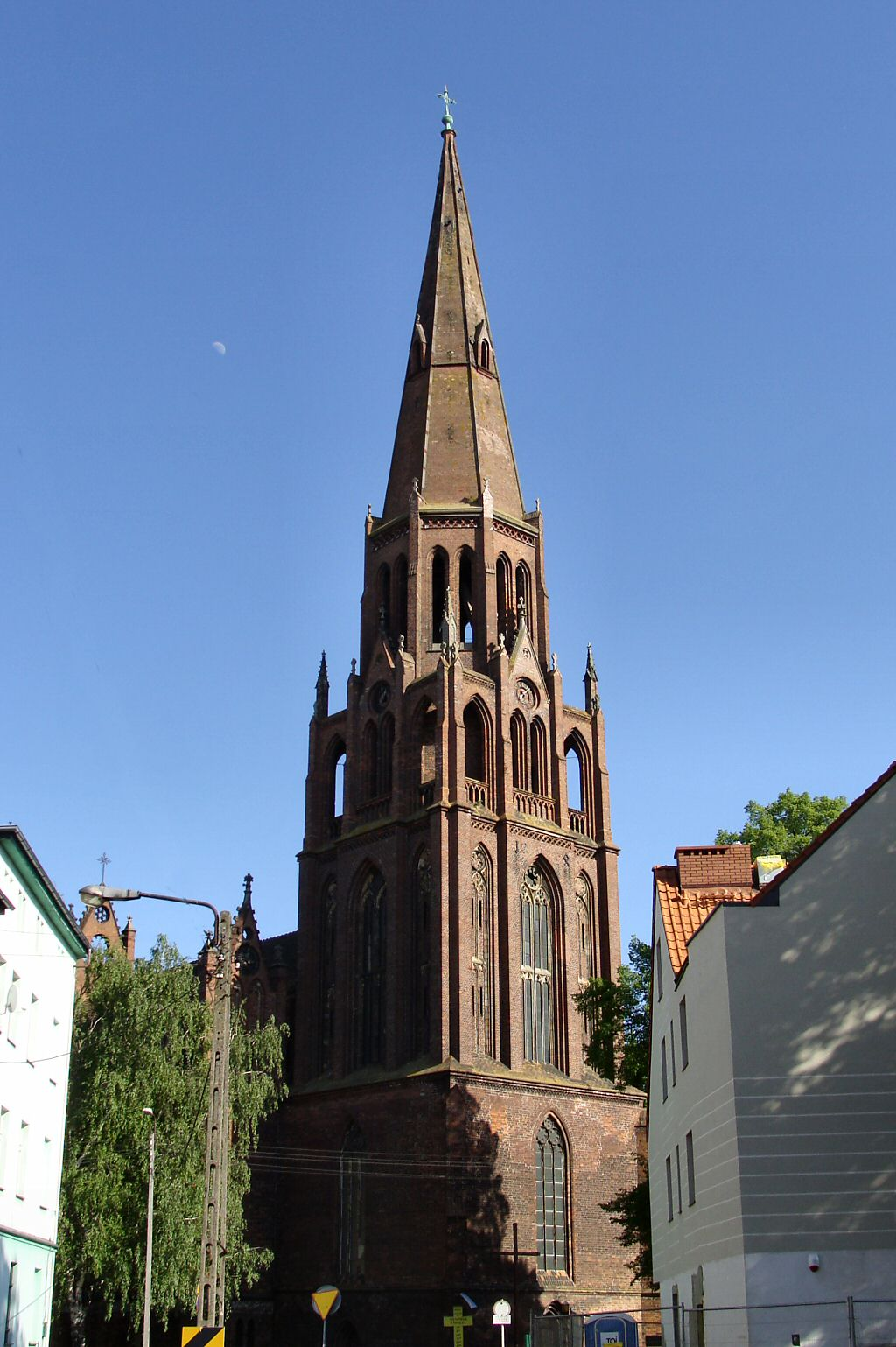
- Church of the Immaculate Conception in Dąbie

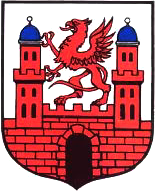
- Coat of arms

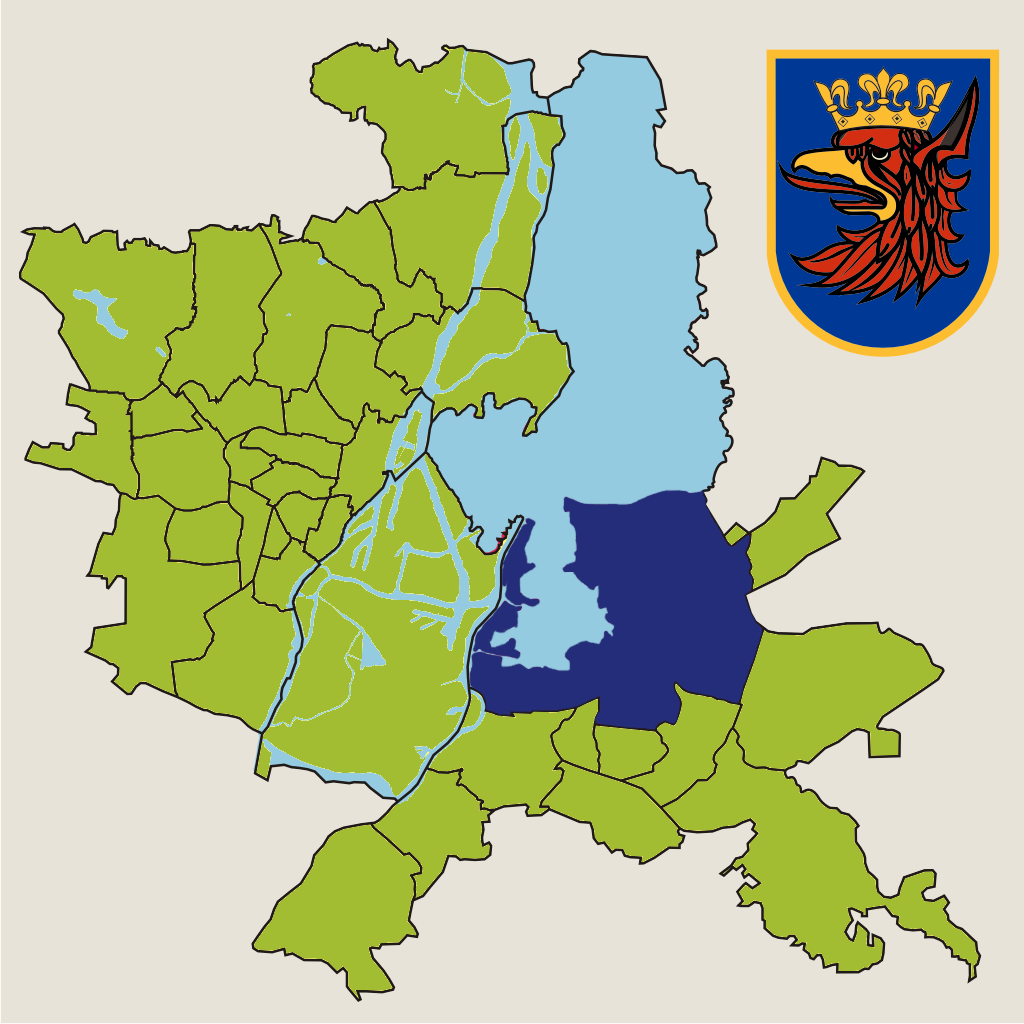
- Location of Dąbie within Szczecin
- Coordinates: 53°22′52″N 14°39′16″E
- Country: Poland
- Voivodeship: West Pomeranian
- County/City: Szczecin

Population (2011)
  - Total: 13,275
- Time zone: UTC+1 (CET)
  - Summer (DST): UTC+2 (CEST)
- Area code: +48 91
- Car plates: ZS

Dąbie (German: Damm, Altdamm, or Stettin-Altdamm) is a former town and current municipal neighbourhood of the city of Szczecin in Poland, situated on the Płonia river, on the south coast of Dąbie Lake, on the right bank of Oder river, east of the Szczecin Old Town and Middle Town. As of January 2011 it had a population of 13,275.

== Dąbie name ==
Map of Damm (1786)

The name of Dąbie is of Slavonic origin and comes from the words like dąb (English: Oak), dąbie, dębina (English: Oak Forest). The early Latin documents show the name as: 1121 Vadam, 1174 Dam, 1157 Dambe, 1179 Damba, 1242 Dambe, 14th century Damnis, and in German documents as: Damn, later Alt Damn (old Dąbie). Before 1945 when Stettin was a part of Germany, the German name of this suburb was Stettin-Altdamm. In 1945 the Polish name was temporarily: Dąb, Dąb Stary and later fixed to Dąbie, based on the earliest documents.

== History ==
In the early 10th century a settlement of the Pomeranians, destroyed in 1121 in the war between Bolesław III of Poland with the Pomeranians. The village was rebuilt and in 1176 it was awarded by duke Warcislaw II to the Cistercian monastery in Kołbacz. In the following years Dąbie became the bridgehead for Szczecin and main trading post for the rich Cistercian land properties.

In 1249 duke Barnim I established a ducal municipality next to the village, and granted it autonomy under Magdeburg rights in 1260, changed to Lübeck rights in 1293.

During World War II a POW camp was erected there. On 20 March 1945, Altdamm was captured by troops of the 1st Belorussian Front of the Red Army in the course of the East Pomeranian offensive. It became part of Poland in 1945 as a result of the Potsdam Agreement. Dąbie was eventually incorporated into Szczecin on 29 April 1948.

== People ==
- Friedrich Gilly (1772–1800), German architect
- Carl Teike (1864–1922), German composer
- Hilde Radusch (1903–1994), German political activist

== Administrative divisions ==
- 1249–1816 - separate town
- 1816–1826 - part of Stettin City
- 1826–1939 - separate town in Randow County
- 1939–1945 - part of Stettin City
- 1945–1948 - separate town in Gryfino County
- after 1948 - part of Szczecin City
