= West Oder =

River in Poland

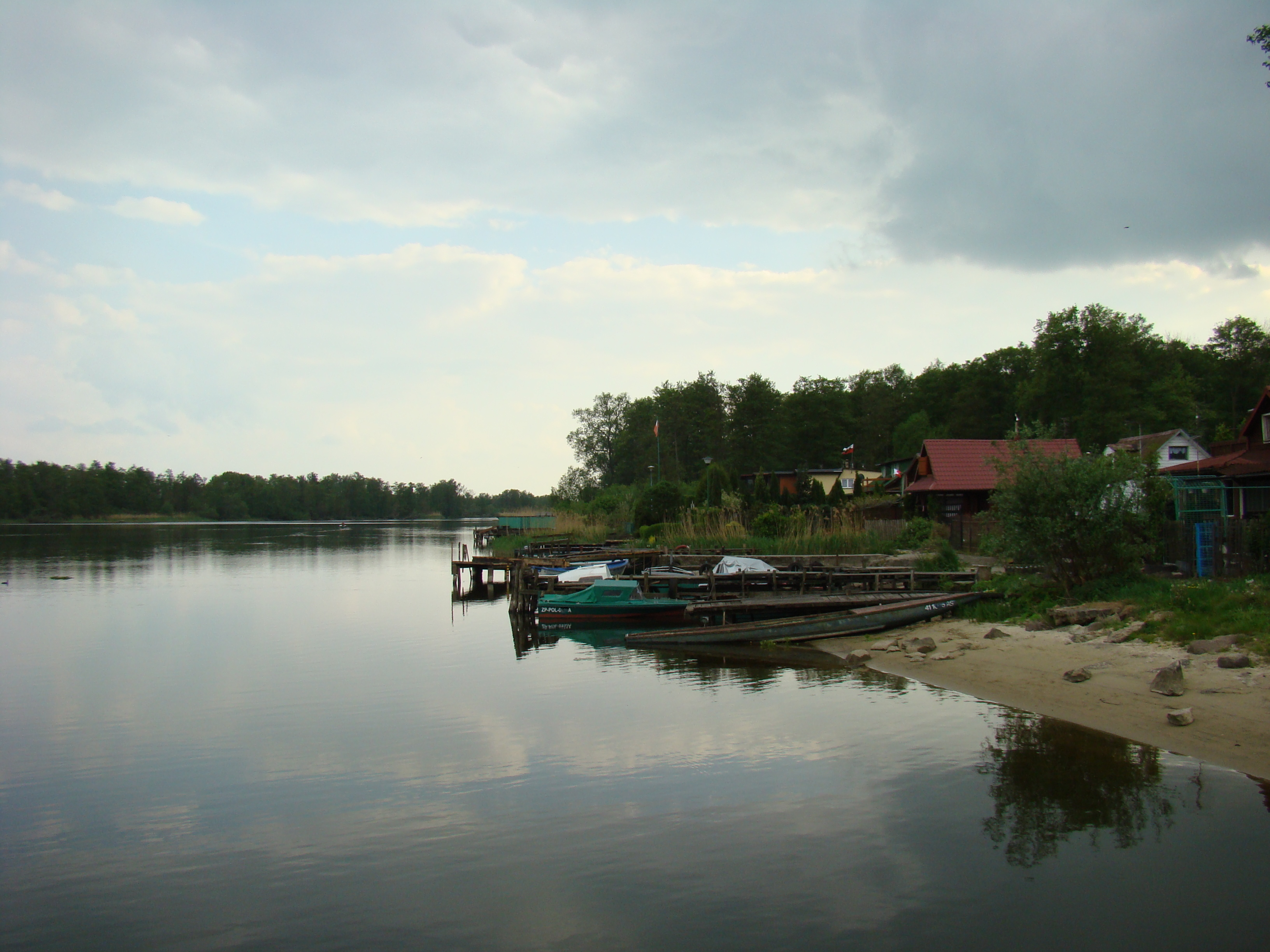
- West Oder in Moczyły

Location
- Country: Poland

Physical characteristics
- Source
  - coordinates: 53.2120°N 14.3318°E
- Mouth
  - coordinates: 53.5223°N 14.6352°E
- Length: 26.4 km (16.4 mi)

Basin features
- Progression: Oder→ Baltic Sea

West Oder (Polish: Odra Zachodnia) is the western arm of the lower Oder near Szczecin, Poland along the border with Germany. It flows into the Szczecin Lagoon.

The river flows through the Lower Oder Valley forming, along with the East Oder (Polish: Odra Wschodnia), an area called Międzyodrze, part of the Lower Odra Valley Landscape Park. Międzyodrze area is traversed by a network of canals and old riverbeds, linked with West Oder. Between the split of Odra arms to the Regalica, East Oder runs through the Gryfino County.

== See also ==
- East Oder, or Regalica
