= Józef Piłsudski Street, Szczecin =

Street in Szczecin, Poland

Józef Piłsudski Street
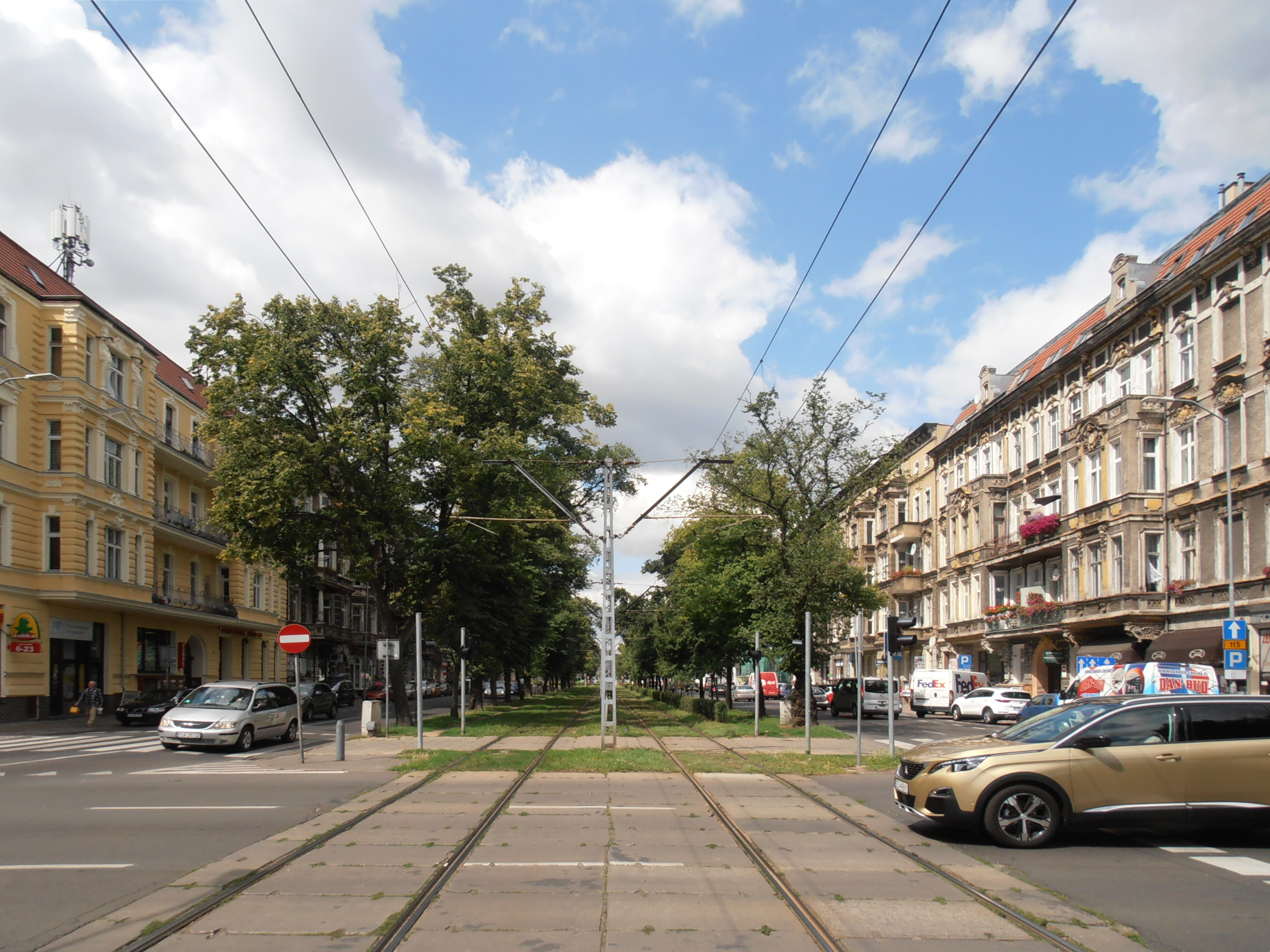
- View from Grunwaldzki Square towards Odrodzenia Square

- Location within Poland
- Former names: Friedrich-Karl-Straße, Pomeranian Avenue, Marian Buczek Street
- Part of: Centrum
- Length: 926 m (3,038 ft)
- Location: Szczecin
- Coordinates: 53°25′55.0″N 14°33′12.0″E

Józef Piłsudski Street is located in Centrum, Szczecin, within the Śródmieście district. The street spans approximately 926 m and runs roughly from east to west, connecting Jan Matejko Street with Gray Ranks Square. It is a significant urban street featuring tenements that are listed in both the municipal registry and the Registry of Cultural Property. The entire length of the street forms part of the Voivodeship road 115.

== History ==
=== Before World War II ===
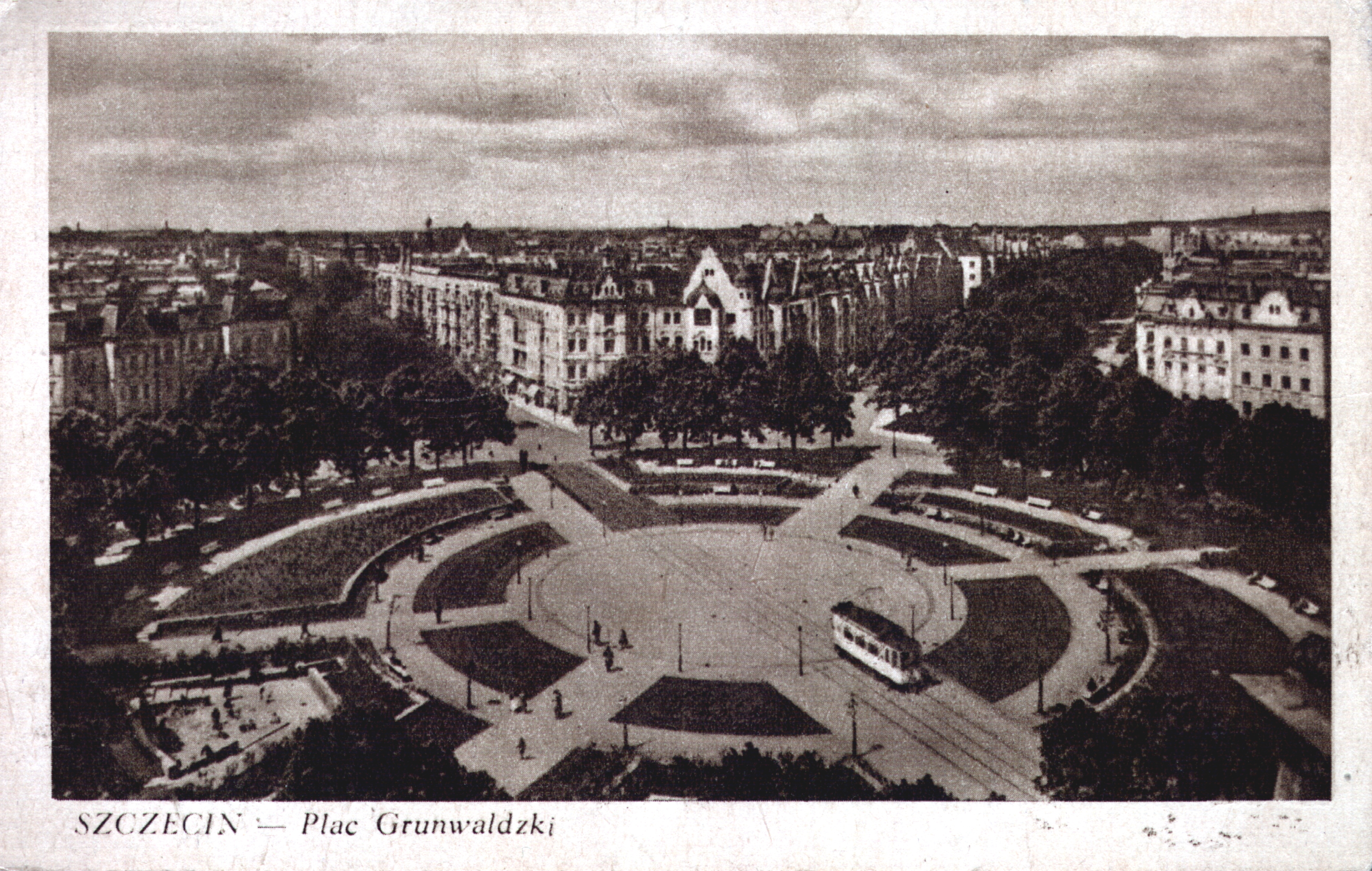
Kaiser-Wilhelm-Platz aligned with Friedrich-Karl-Straße

Friedrich-Karl-Straße near Friedrich-Karl-Platz

In 1864, Szczecin urban planner James Hobrecht drafted a plan for the development of areas created after the demolition of Fort Wilhelm, which was located near today's Grunwaldzki Square. Hobrecht envisioned creating polygonal squares with radiating streets, two main ones (nos. 30 and 54) intersecting at the square Kaiser-Wilhelm-Platz.

In 1877, street no. 54 was named Friedrich-Karl-Straße in honor of Friedrich Karl, a Prussian prince and Generalfeldmarschall. At the same time, the street's final width was defined and its route was adjusted. The initial plan for a regular intersection between Grunwald Square and Gray Ranks Square was replaced with another star-shaped square, Revival Square. In the 1890s, plots along the street were developed with multi-story, eclectic tenement houses. An example of a building from this period is the tenement house at no. 7, designed by Georg Sommenstuhl in 1897.

Between 1905 and 1906, a building for Dr. Gesenius Höhere Töchterschule was constructed on plot no. 40. About 20 years later, this building was demolished, and a modernist building was erected between 1927 and 1928, housing the Gesenius-Wegener-Oberlyzeum (formed in 1915 from the merger of Dr. Gesenius Höhere Töchterschule and Dr. Wegener-Lyzeum).

From 1928 to 1935, the Polish consulate in Szczecin operated in the building at no. 9.

=== 1939–1989 ===
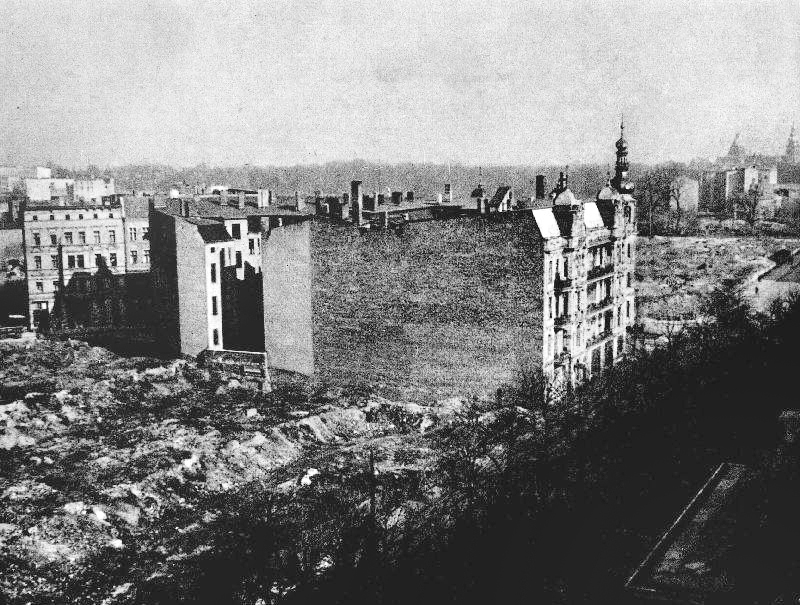
Pomorska Avenue after clearing. The tenement house no. 7 is in the foreground

During the bombings of Szczecin in World War II, the section between today's Grunwaldzki Square and Wyzwolenia Avenue suffered the most damage. The air raid on the night of 20/21 April 1943 damaged a tenement house at the corner of Wielkopolska Street and today's Gray Ranks Square (modern address: 20 Wielkopolska Street).

In 1945, Friedrich-Karl-Straße was renamed Pomeranian Avenue. In 1947, the street was renamed again to Marian Buczek Street.

The former Gesenius-Wegener-Oberlyzeum building became the Social Insurance Institution (later the Provincial Specialist Clinics Group). In the late 1940s, the tenement house at no. 7 housed the Western Press Agency, no. 20 the County Agricultural Office of the Chamber of Agriculture for the District of Western Pomerania, no. 23 the Regional Inspectorate of Revenue Protection and the Revenue Protection Brigade, and no. 29 the Polish Workers' Party.

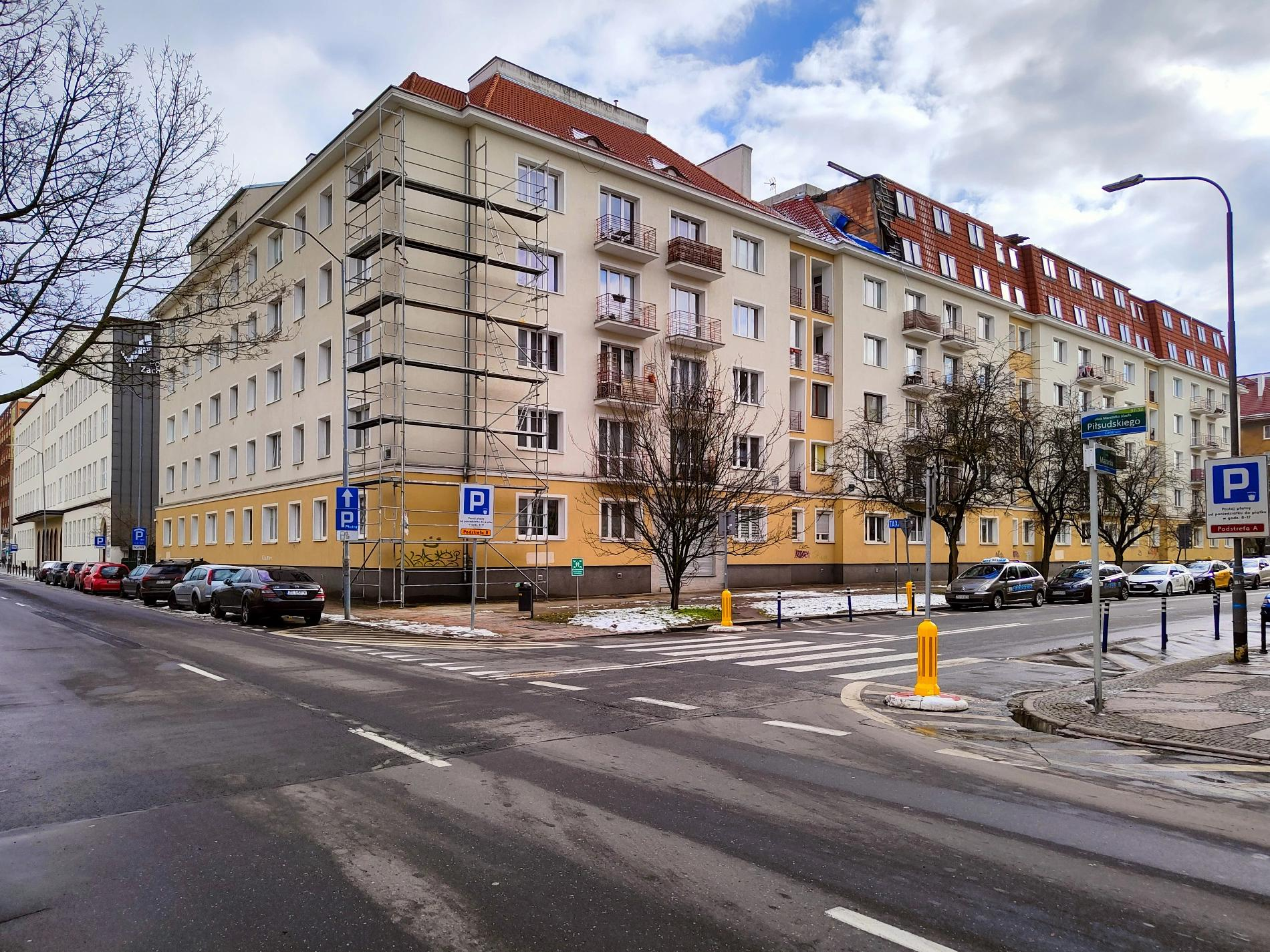
Śródmieście Residential District block on the corner with Mazurska Street

The first post-war building on Buczek Street, the Śródmieście Residential District block, was constructed between 1956 and 1957 at the corner with Mazurska Street. Another, designed by Henryk Nardy and designated C-3, was built between 1958 and 1959 at the corner with Jaromir Street (today's Wyzwolenia Avenue). Between 1963 and 1965, one of Szczecin's first tower blocks, designed by Tadeusz Ostrowski, was constructed at the corner with Świerczewski Street (today's Ludomił Rayski Street) at Grunwaldzki Square. From 1967 to 1972, the Mosaic gallery block was built at the corner with Jaromir Street (currently at the southeastern corner of Rodło Square), designed by R. Fyda-Karwowska.

In the late 1970s and early 1980s, the street layout was redesigned, including extending Marian Buczek Street from Roosevelt Street to Matejko Street and constructing Rodło Square in place of the former triangular, tree-lined intersection of Buczek/Jaromir/Roosevelt streets. In 1972, the tram tracks on Buczek Street were rebuilt. The tracks on the northern carriageway were removed, and new ones were laid on the former boardwalk between the northern and southern carriageways.

=== After 1989 ===
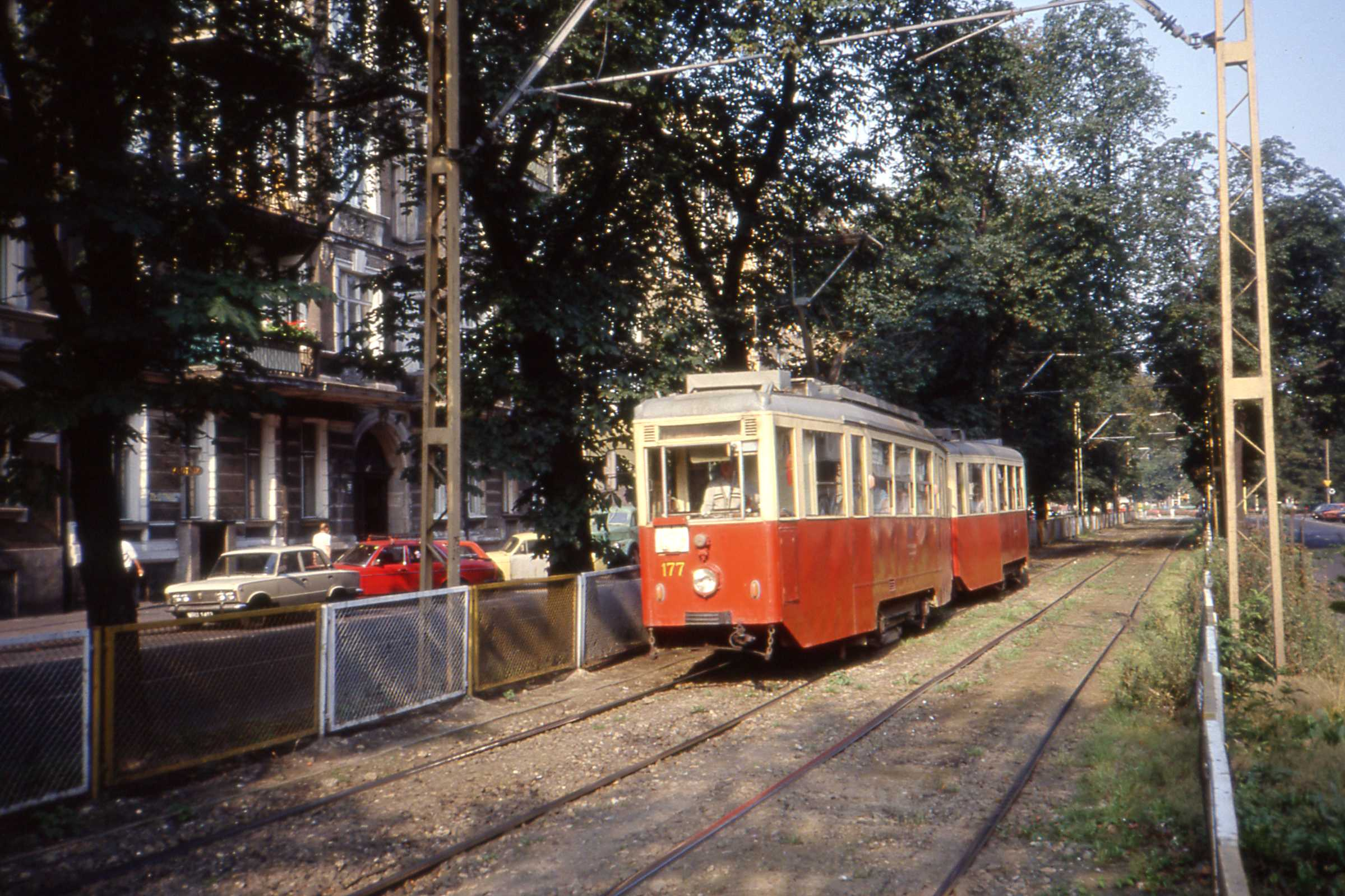
Marian Buczek Avenue between Grunwaldzki Square and Odrodzenia Square in 1990

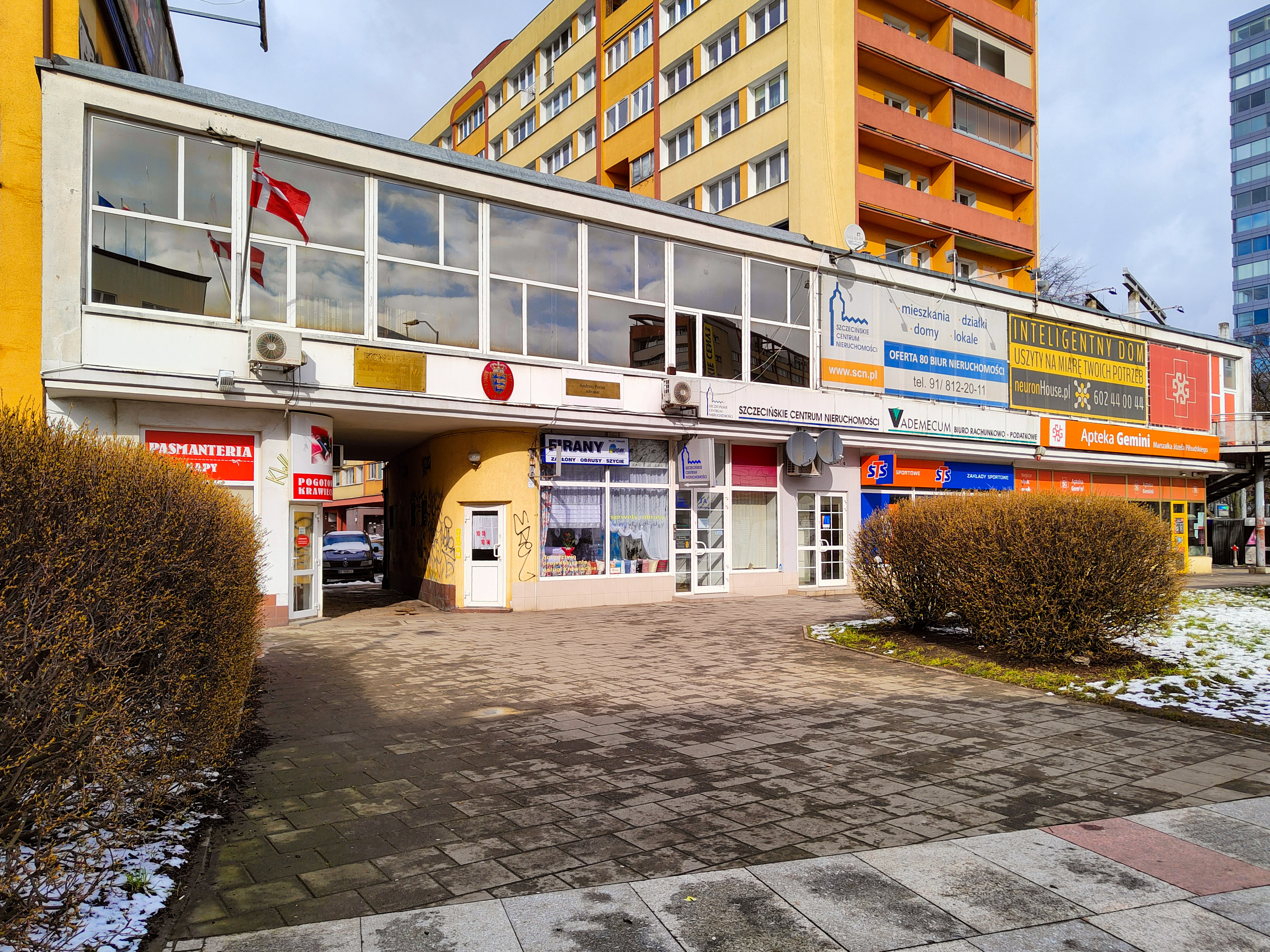
Consulate of the Kingdom of Denmark

On 12 December 1990 at Rodło Square, on the corner of Wyzwolenia Avenue and Buczek Street, the cornerstone was laid for the construction of the Pazim skyscraper, designed by Miroslav Genga and Ivo Majorunc, which was completed in November 1992. By virtue of Szczecin City Council Resolution No. XIV/125/91 of 27 May 1991, Marian Buczek Avenue was renamed Józef Piłsudski Street. From June 26 to August 31, 1992, the Municipal Transport Company in Szczecin and Kapri company carried out the modernization of tram tracks along the entire length of the avenue. Further from Pazim, at the intersection of Piłsudski and Matejko streets, the Pomeranus office building was erected for the Social Insurance Institution.

On 15 January 2020, the modernization of tram infrastructure at Gray Ranks Square began. As part of this investment, tram tracks on Piłsudski Street from the aforementioned square to Odrodzenia Square were replaced.

On 24 July 2021, another tram track renovation began on the section from Matejko Street to Mazurska Street. The modernization was completed the following year, and tram traffic was restored on 27 June 2022.

In April 2022, after several years of renovation, the West Pomeranian Voivodeship Marshal's Office moved into building no. 40. Previously, this building housed a clinic and until 2004, the Delfin cinema operated there. The Consulate of the Kingdom of Denmark is located in pavilion no. 1 on the corner with Rodło Square.

== Names ==
Years in force	Name
1877–1945	Friedrich-Karl-Straße
1945–1947	Pomeranian Avenue
1947–1991	Marian Buczek Street
since 1991	Józef Pilsudski Street

== Road layout ==
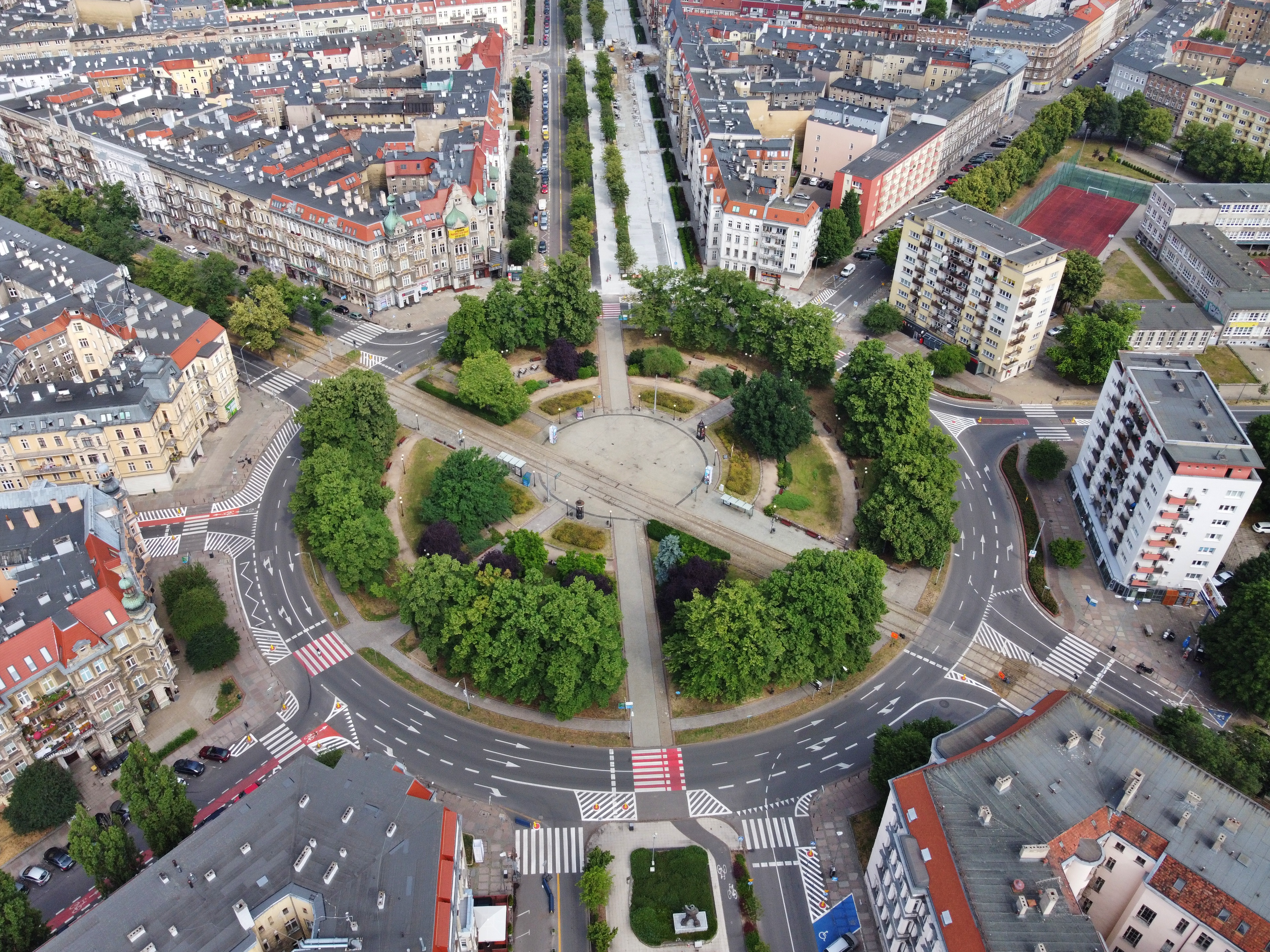
Grunwald Square

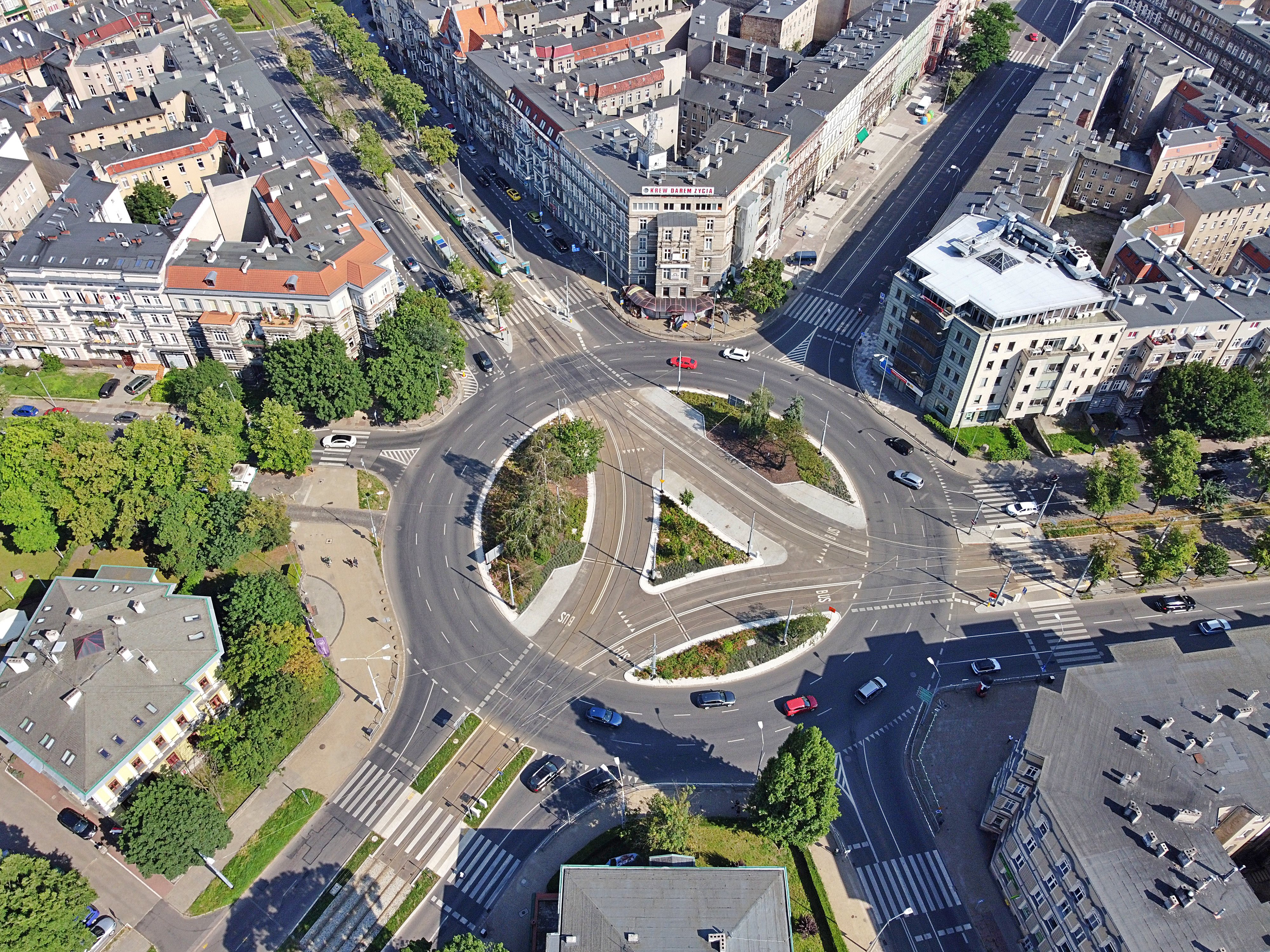
Gray Ranks Square

The street connects to the following public roads:

Intersection	Route
Intersection, beginning of the street	Jan Matejko Street
Intersection	Rodło Square: Wyzwolenia Avenue
Intersection	Mazurska Street
Intersection	Grunwaldzki Square: John Paul II Avenue; Śląska Street; Rayski Street
Intersection	Odrodzenia Square: Mazurska Street; Monte Cassino Street
Intersection, end of the street	Gray Ranks Square: Wielkopolska Street; Wojska Polskiego Avenue; 5 Lipca Street; Piastów Avenue

The street is located on land lots with a total area of 43,223 m^{2}, and the total length of the roads assigned to the street is 775 m.

=== Roads and land lots ===
Road	Length	Land lot	Area
Provincial road from Matejko Street to Rodło Square	103.7 m	8/13	6,384 m^{2}
Provincial road from Rodło Square to Grunwaldzki Square	344.7 m	9/2	12,582 m^{2}
Road from Grunwaldzki Square to Odrodzenia Square	184.6 m	23	7,380 m^{2}
Road from Revival Square to Gray Ranks Square	142 m	14	5,678 m^{2}
	775 m	total	43,223 m^{2}

== Public transport ==
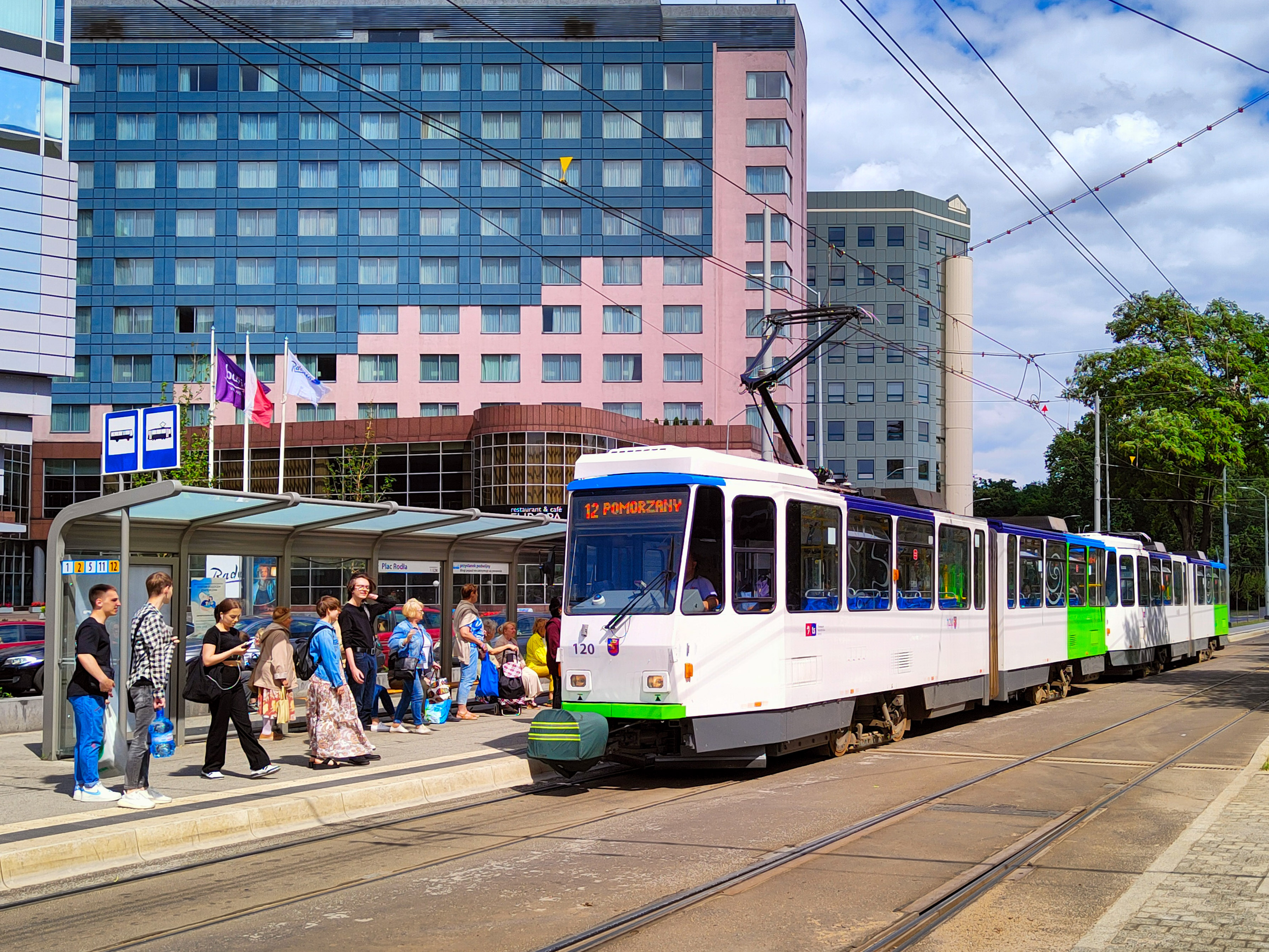
Trams of line no. 12 at the Rodło Square stop on Piłsudski Street

As of 6 September 2023, the following tram and bus lines run along Piłsudski Street:

- 1 (entire length, permanent route)
- 7 (entire length, temporary route)
- 11 (entire length, permanent route)
- 12 (from Rodło Square to Gray Ranks Square permanent route)
- 68 (from Rodło Square to Matejko Street, permanent route)
- 70 (from Rodło Square to Grunwaldzki Square, permanent route)
- 86 (from Mazurska Street to Rodło Square, permanent route)
- 90 (from Rodło Square to Grunwaldzki Square, permanent route)
- 107 (from Rodło Square to Matejko Street, permanent route)
- 523 (from Rodło Square to Gray Ranks Square, permanent route)
- 524 (from Rodło Square to Gray Ranks Square, permanent route)
- 531 (from Rodło Square to Gray Ranks Square, permanent route)

== Development and management ==
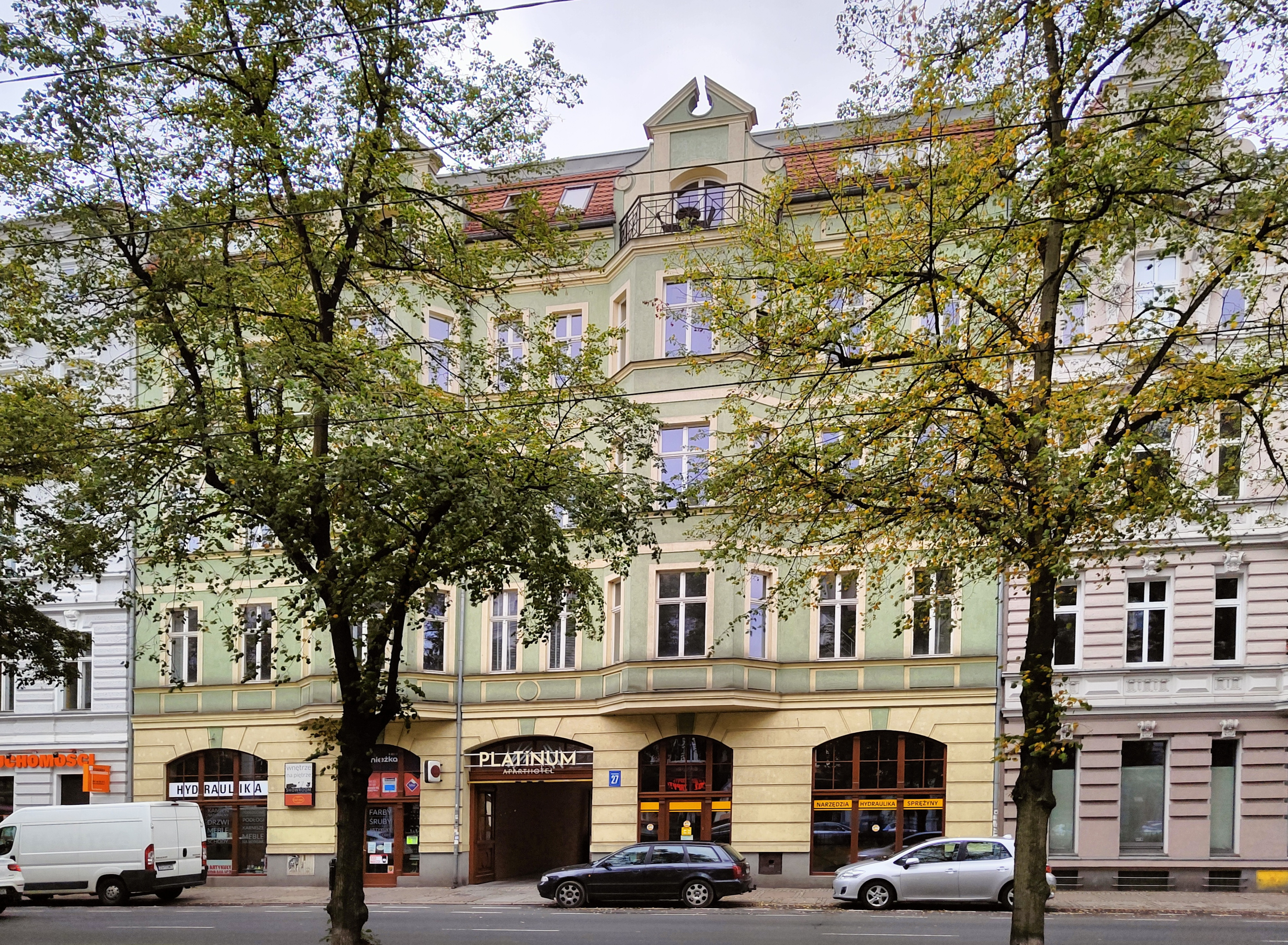
Building no. 27 – reconstruction of a pre-war building destroyed in World War II

The initial section of the street, from Matejko Street to Roosevelt Street, was laid out in 1978 during the redevelopment of the transport system in the eastern part of today's Centrum district. Along this section, there is no continuous building frontage on the southern side – replaced by the gable walls of buildings belonging to the Powszechny Zakład Ubezpieczeń and the Chamber of Tax Administration situated on Matejko and Roosevelt streets. The northern side is occupied by the Pomeranus office building, constructed for the Social Insurance Institution, and the Radisson Blu Hotel. Along the section of the street between Roosevelt Street and Rodło Square, there is a gallery block called Mozaika on the southern side, and the Pazim office building on the northern side. The buildings along the street from Rodło Square to Mazurska Street are almost entirely post-war structures. An exception is the pre-war high school building at no. 40, currently housing the Marshal's Office of the West Pomeranian Voivodeship. Between Mazurska Street and Grunwaldzki Square, four tenement houses from the late 19th century remain: three on the southern frontage and one on the northern frontage. The southern frontage was complemented post-war with a block having a sloped roof, and the northern frontage with a flat-roof block and a high-rise at the corner with Grunwaldzki Square. From Grunwald Square to Gray Ranks Square, continuous 19th-century tenement housing lines both sides of the street. Notable is building no. 27 on the southern frontage, constructed between 2007 and 2010 by architect Barbara Garncarz as a reconstruction of a tenement destroyed during the war.

== Protection and monuments ==
The following monuments are located on the street and in its immediate vicinity:

Historical buildings
Object, location	Description, protection form	Photograph
Northern side
Tenement house 7 Piłsudski Street	Register of monuments no. 921, 13 August 2013	
Tenement house 13 Piłsudski Street	Municipal register of monuments	
Tenement house 14 Piłsudski Street	Municipal register of monuments	
Tenement house 15 Piłsudski Street	Municipal register of monuments	
Tenement house 16 Piłsudski Street	Municipal register of monuments	
Tenement house 17 Piłsudski Street	Municipal register of monuments	
Tenement house 18 Piłsudski Street	Municipal register of monuments	
Tenement house 19 Piłsudski Street	Municipal register of monuments	
Tenement house 20 Piłsudski Street	Municipal register of monuments	
Tenement house 21 Piłsudski Street	Municipal register of monuments	
Tenement house Dehna; 22 Piłsudski Street	Municipal register of monuments	
Southern side
Tenement house 23 Piłsudski Street	Municipal register of monuments	
Tenement house 24 Piłsudski Street	Municipal register of monuments	
Tenement house 24A Piłsudski Street	Municipal register of monuments	
Tenement house 24B Piłsudski Street	Municipal register of monuments	
Tenement house 24C Piłsudski Street	Municipal register of monuments	
Tenement house 25 Piłsudski Street	Municipal register of monuments	
Tenement house 26 Piłsudski Street	Municipal register of monuments	
Tenement house 28 Piłsudski Street	Municipal register of monuments	
Tenement house 29 Piłsudski Street	Municipal register of monuments	
Tenement house 30 Piłsudski Street	Municipal register of monuments	
Tenement house 31 Piłsudski Street	Municipal register of monuments	
Tenement house 36 Piłsudski Street	Municipal register of monuments	
Tenement house 37 Piłsudski Street	Municipal register of monuments	
West Pomeranian Voivodeship Marshal's Office; 40 Piłsudski Street	Municipal register of monuments	

=== Tenement house no. 37 ===
This tenement was built according to the design of architects Eugen Wechselmann and Wilhelm O. Zimmermann. It is a four-story building with a corner bay window topped with an octagonal dome. The side elevations are varied with bay windows topped with stepped cornices, between which there are balconies. One of the apartments on the third floor was occupied from 1905 to 1907 by Erwin Ackerknecht, a German literary historian, professor of philosophy, writer, librarian, and teacher.

== Bibliography ==
- Białecki, Tadeusz, ed. (2015). Encyklopedia Szczecina. Wydanie jubileuszowe z okazji 70-lecia polskiego Szczecina (in Polish). Szczecin: Szczecińskie Towarzystwo Kultury. ISBN 978-83-942725-0-0.
