= Statue of the Sailor =

Statue in Szczecin, Poland

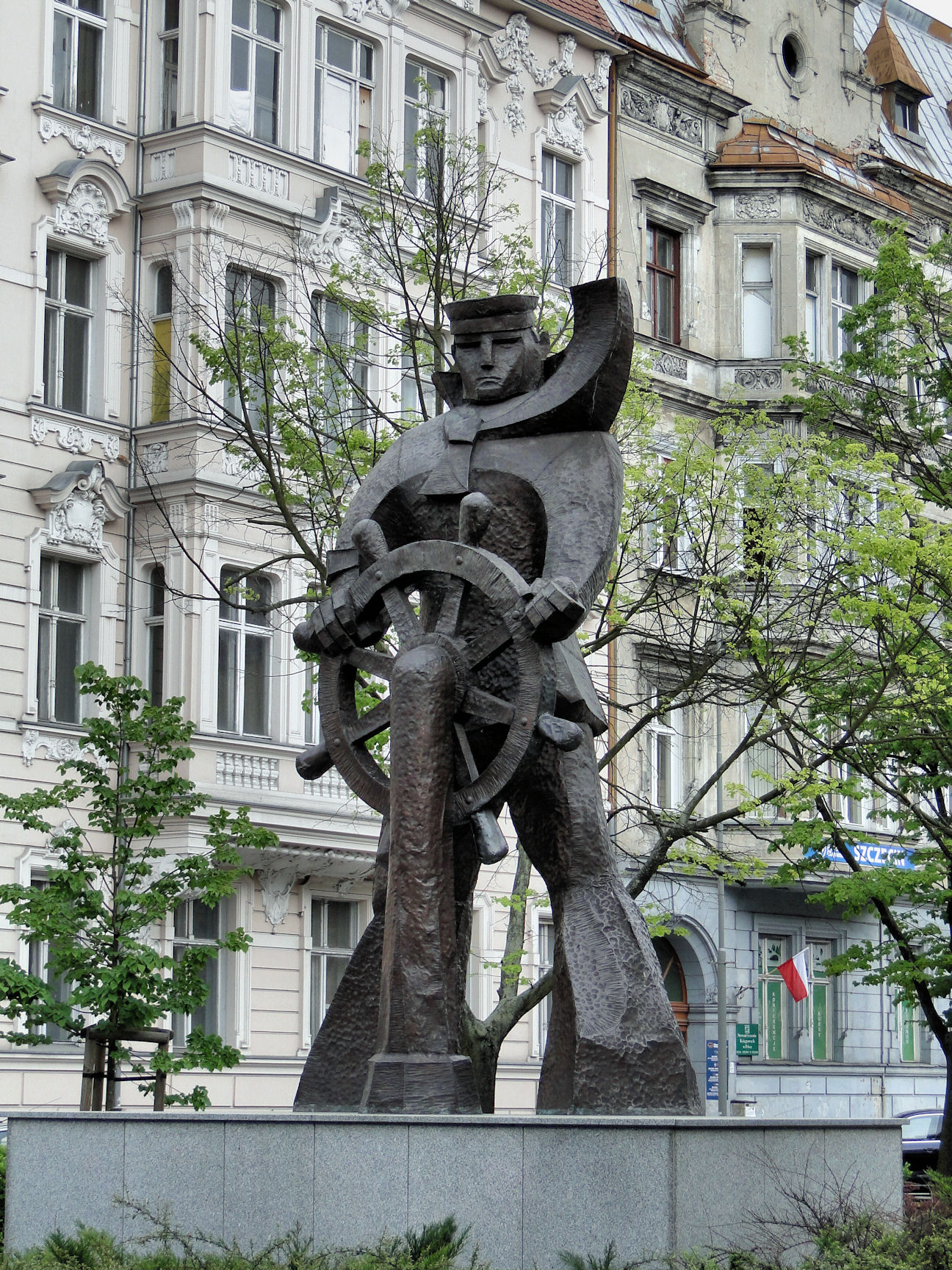
- The statue in 2012.
- Interactive map of Statue of the Sailor
- Location: Grunwald Square, Szczecin, Poland
- Coordinates: 53°25′56″N 14°32′55″E
- Designer: Ryszard Chachulski
- Type: Statue
- Material: copper plate, concrete
- Height: 385 cm (152 in)
- Completion date: 19 June 1980
- Dedicated to: Sailors

The statue of the Sailor (Polish: Pomnik Marynarza) is a sculpture in Szczecin, Poland, within the Centre neighbourhood of the Downtown district. It is placed on the Pope John Paul II Avenue, next to the Grunwald Square. The statue was designed by Ryszard Chachulski and unveiled on 19 June 1980.

== Description ==
The monument has a form of statue of the helmsman sailor standing behind ship's wheel. It is made out of copper plate and stands on the concrete plinth veneered with gray granite plates. The height of the statue is 385 cm (12.6 ft) and total height of the monument is 495 cm (16.3 ft).

== Christmas season ==
Every year since 2017, on 1 December, the monument is dressed up in the costume of Santa Claus, with given the mantle, trousers, hat and beard. The event is organised by Polsteam as part of a promotional campaign of the local Christmas market that takes place at Polish Soldier Square and Aviators Square.

It takes 1.5 hours to dress up the statue. The costume was made by a team of three people, and required around 25 metres of the material, three metres of sheepskin coat and 10 metres of zipper.

== Gallery ==
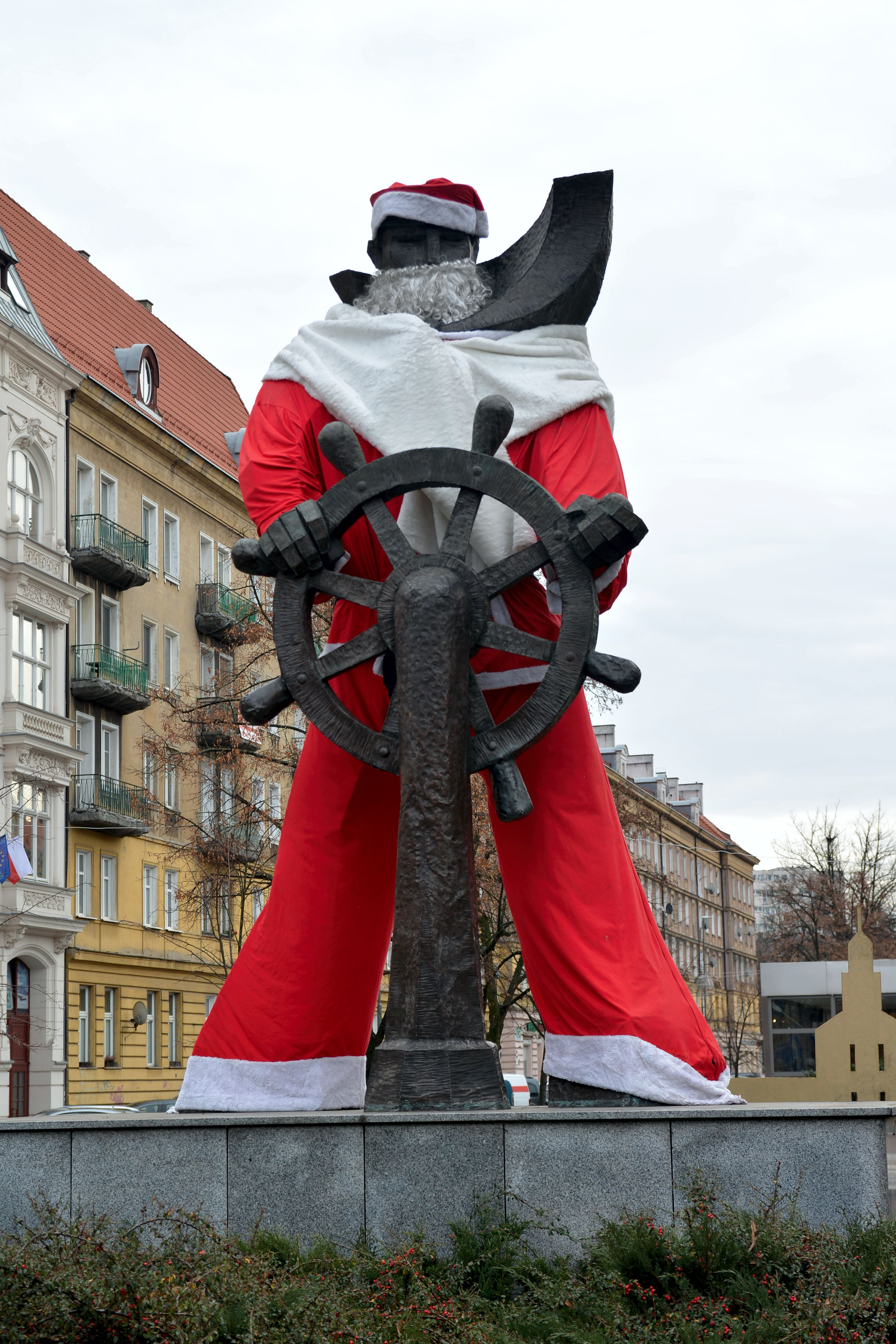
The statue of the Sailor dressed up as Santa Claus in December 2020.
