= Revival Square =

Urban square in Szczecin, Poland

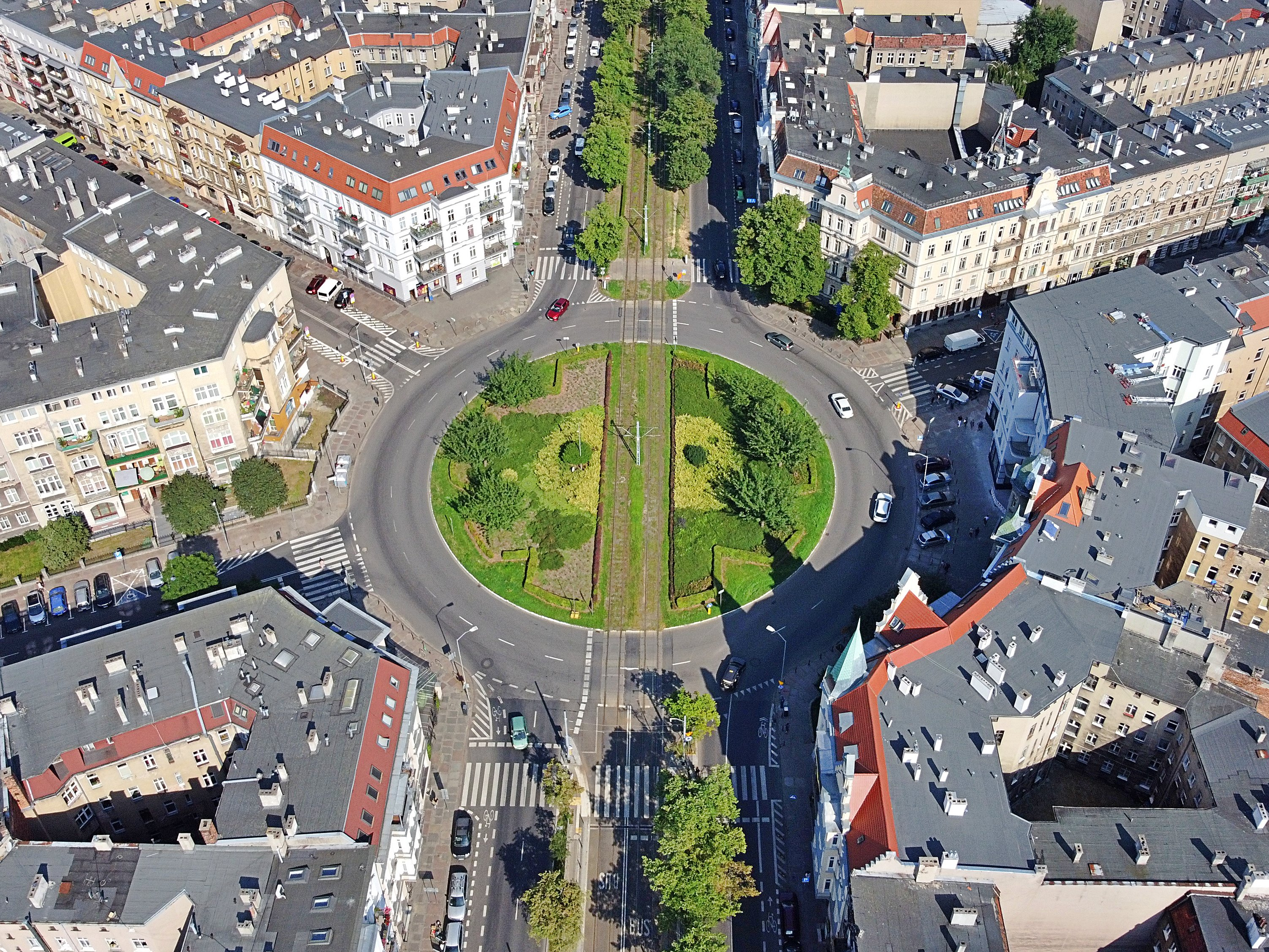
- Revival Square in 2021.

- Location within Poland
- Former names: Friedrich Karl Square (1882–1945); Joseph Stalin (1945–1956)
- Type: Urban square
- Location: Szczecin, Poland
- Coordinates: 53°25′59″N 14°32′37″E
- North: Monte Cassino Street; Mazurska Street
- East: Piłsudskiego Street
- South: Monte Cassino Street
- West: Piłsudskiego Street

Construction
- Completion: 1880s

The Revival Square (Polish: Plac Odrodzenia) is an urban square and a roundabout in Szczecin, Poland. It is located in the neighbourhood of Centrum, within the district of Śródmieście, at the intersection of Mazurska Street, Monte Cassino Street, and Piłsudskiego Street. It was designed in 1882.

== History ==
The square was designed in 1882, and originally named the Friedrich Karl Square (German: Friedrich-Karl-Platz), after Friedrich Karl of Prussia, a prince in the Prussian royal family and the general field marshal of the Prussian Army. It was surrounded with electrified multi-storey tenement houses, originally richly decorated with details such as railing, roof peaks, and domes. Most of the decorations did not survive the Second World War. Several of the buildings were also rebuilt or modified after the war.

In 1946, at the square was set up the station of the provisional railway used to dispose of the rubble from the area after the conflict.

In 1945, it was renamed to the Joseph Stalin Square (Polish: Plac Józefa Stalina), after Joseph Stalin, a politician and communist revolutionary who led the Soviet Union from 1924 to 1953. In 1956, it was renamed to its current name, the Revival Square (Polish: Plac Odrodzenia).

== Characteristics ==
Revival Square is located in the neighbourhood of Centrum, and placed on the axis of Piłsudskiego Street, between Grunwald Square to the east and Grey Ranks Square to the west. It forms a roundabout at the intersection of Mazurska Street, Monte Cassino Street, and Piłsudskiego Street. It is also crossed by the tram tracks, than run through Piłsudskiego Street. The square is surrounded by tenements.
