= Marshal Józef Piłsudski Memorial =

2000 bronze sculpture in Szczecin, Poland

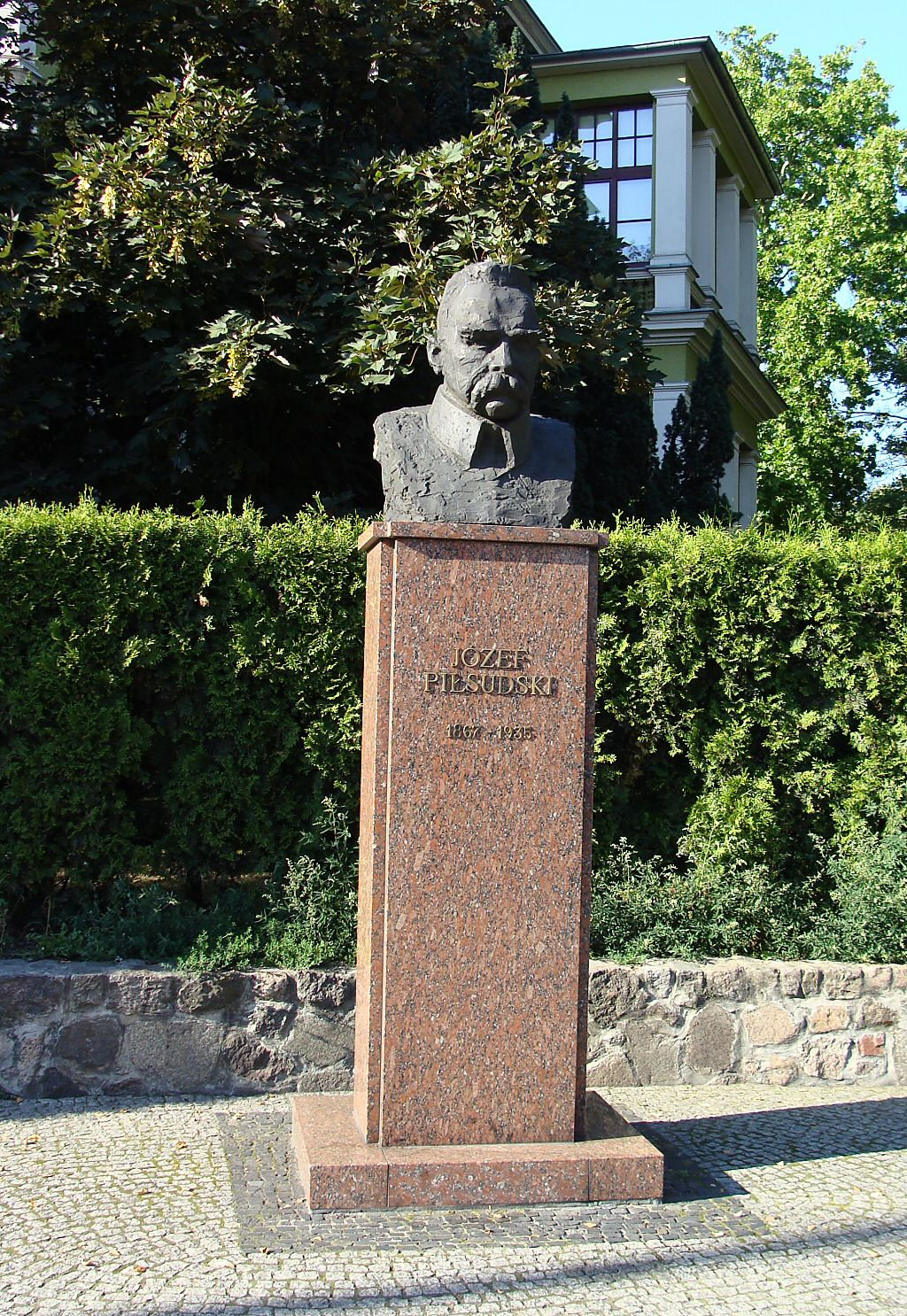
- The monument in 2008.
- Interactive map of Marshal Józef Piłsudski Memorial
- Location: Grey Ranks Square, Szczecin, Poland
- Coordinates: 53°26′01.00″N 14°32′24.73″E
- Designer: Bohdan Ronin-Walknowski
- Type: Bust on a pedestal
- Material: Bronze (bust); granite (pedestal)
- Height: 316 cm (total); 96 cm (bust)
- Weight: 350 kg
- Completion date: November 1999
- Opening date: 19 June 2000
- Dedicated to: Józef Piłsudski

The Marshal Józef Piłsudski Memorial (Polish: Pomnik marszałka Józefa Piłsudskiego) is a bronze bust statue in Szczecin, Poland, placed at the Grey Ranks Square, at the corner of Polish Armed Forces Avenue and Greater Poland Street, within the Centre neighbourhood. It is dedicated to Józef Piłsudski, a 19th- and 20th-century military officer and statesman, who, served as the Chief of State and Marshal of Poland, and later was the de factor leader of the country, as the Minister of Military Affairs. It was designed by Bohdan Ronin-Walknowski and unveiled on 19 June 2000.

== History ==
The monument was proposed by the Józef Piłsudski Memorial Association, and sculptor Bohdan Ronin-Walknowski who designed it. The bust was based on the photography of the sculpture depicting Piłsudki, made before the Second World War by Konstanty Laszczka. It was cast in bronze in November 1999, and unveiled at the Grey Ranks Square on 19 June 2000.

== Overview ==
The monument consists of a bronze bust of Józef Piłsudski, depicted wearing a military uniform and with large moustache, placed on a tall pedestal with square base, made from red granite. It features an inscription which reads "Józef Piłsudski 1867–1935". The monument has a height of 316 cm, with the bust measuring 96 cm. It weighs 350 kg.
