= List of places named after Joseph Stalin =

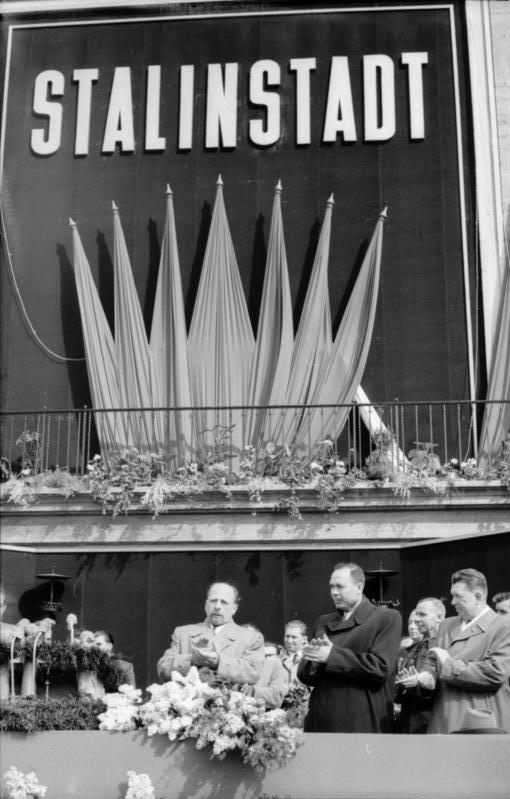
Eisenhüttenstadt was given the name Stalinstadt in 1953.

During Joseph Stalin's rule (1922–1953), many places, mostly cities, in the Soviet Union and other communist countries were named or renamed in honour of him as part of the cult of personality surrounding him. Most of these places had their names changed back to the original ones shortly after the 20th Congress of the Communist Party of the Soviet Union in 1956 or after the beginning of de-Stalinization in 1961.

In some countries, including those in the West, there are streets, squares, etc. named after Stalingrad (and hence indirectly after Stalin) in honour of the courage shown by the defenders at the Battle of Stalingrad against Nazi Germany. These names have not been changed since they refer to the battle rather than the city itself.

== Cities ==
=== Eastern Europe ===
==== Albania ====
- Qyteti Stalin, 1950–1990 – Kuçovë

==== Bulgaria ====
- Stalin, 1949–1956 – Varna

==== East Germany ====
- Stalinstadt, 1953–1961 – Eisenhüttenstadt

==== Hungary ====
- Sztálinváros, 1951–1961 – Dunaújváros

==== Poland ====
- Stalinogród, 1953–1956 – Katowice

==== Romania ====
- Orașul Stalin, 1950–1960 – Brașov
- Stalin Region, 1950–1960 – Brașov County

=== Former Soviet Union ===
==== Armenia ====
- Imeni Stalina, – Aygevan

==== Azerbaijan ====
- Stalino, – Çaylı, Tartar
- Stalino, – Stalino, Goygol

==== Georgia ====
- Staliniri, 1934–1961 – Tskhinvali, South Ossetia
- Stalinisi, 1931–1934 – Khashuri, Shida Kartli

==== Russia ====
- Stalingrad, 1925–1961 – Volgograd
- Stalinogorsk, 1934–1961 – Novomoskovsk
- Stalinsk, 1932–1969 – Novokuznetsk

==== Tajikistan ====
- Stalinabad, 1929–1961 – Dushanbe

==== Turkmenistan ====
- Stalin District, 1935–1961 - Murgap District

==== Ukraine ====
- Stalin, 1924–1929 – Donetsk
- Stalino, 1929–1961 – Donetsk

== Parks and natural places ==
=== Former Soviet Union ===
==== Azerbaijan ====
- Stalin raion, – Sabail raion

==== Tajikistan ====
- Pik Stalina (Stalin Peak), 1932–1962 – Ismoil Somoni Peak

=== Eastern Europe ===
==== Bulgaria ====
- Vrah Stalin (Stalin Peak), 1950–1962 – Musala

==== Czech Republic ====
- Stalingrad – Housing estate Karviná-Nové Město
- Stalingrad – Housing estate built in 1950s Žďár nad Sázavou, The name Stalingrad is still in use in this town as of 2009 despite some attempts to rename the borough after the Velvet revolution.

==== Czechoslovakia ====
- Stalinovy závody (Stalin factories) in Záluží (today within Litvínov), 1946–1962. Chemical factory founded under the name Sudetenländische Treibstoffwerk AG in Maltheuern (now Záluží) in World War II as part of the Hermann-Göring Conglomerate (named after Nazi leader Hermann Göring) to produce synthetic oil.

==== Romania ====
- Raionul Stalin (Stalin city district), Bucharest,
- Regiunea Stalin (Stalin region), in central Romania (1950–1960)
- Poiana Stalin, Poiana Braşov (1950–1960)

==== Slovakia ====
- Stalinov štít (in Slovak, Stalinův štít or štít J. V. Stalina in Czech, Stalin Peak or J. V. Stalin Peak), 1949–1961 – Gerlachov Peak,

=== Asia ===
==== China ====
- Stalin Park – Park Harbin

=== North America ===
==== Canada ====
- Geographic Township of Stalin, before 1986 – Geographic Township of Hansen, Ontario
- Mount Stalin, before 1987 – Mount Peck, British Columbia

== Streets and squares ==
=== Eastern Europe ===
==== Albania ====
- Bulevardi Stalin (Stalin Boulevard) – now Zogu I Boulevard, Tirana

==== Czechoslovakia ====
- Stalinova ulice (Stalin Street) – now Vinohradská tř. (from 1962; formerly: Říčanská, Černokostelecká, Jungmannova (1884–1920), Fochova (1920–1940), Schwerinova (1940–1945)), Prague
- Stalinova ulice – now Starochodovská ul., Prague
- Stalinova ulice – now Pěkná ul. (1962–1972 Jiráskova ul.), Brno-Chrlice
- Stalinova ulice – now Americká ul. (Stodolní, Jungmannova, Moskevská, Vítězná), Plzeň
- Stalinova třída / třída Generalissima Stalina (Stalin Road / Generalissimus Stalin Road) – now Revoluční ul. (formerly Hauptstraße), Krnov,
- Stalinova třída – now třída Míru, Pardubice
- Stalinovo náměstí (Stalin Square) – now Palackého nám., Bruntál
- Stalinovo náměstí – now Masarykovo nám., Ostrava
- Stalinovo náměstí – now Mariánské nám., Uherský Brod
- Stalinovy sady (Stalin Park) – now Koliště, Brno-město
- Námestie J.V. Stalina / Nám. maršála J.V. Stalina / Stalinovo námestie (J.V. Stalin Square / Marshal J.V. Stalin Square / Stalin Square) – now Námestie Maratónu mieru, Košice
- Stalinova ulica (Stalin Street) – now Hlavná ulica, Prešov
- Stalinovo námestie (Stalin Square) – now Námestie SNP, Bratislava

==== East Germany ====
- Stalinallee (Stalin Avenue) in Berlin, East Germany, 1952–1961 – now Karl-Marx-Allee (see also: Stalin-Allee, about a film featuring this street)
- Stalinallee (Stalin Avenue) in Leipzig, 1949–1951/1956 – now Jahnallee
- Stalinstraße (Stalin Street) – now Lübsche Straße, Wismar
- Stalinstraße – now St.Annen-Straße, Brandenburg an der Havel
- Stalinstraße – now Wismarsche Straße, Schwerin
- Stalinstraße – now Gartenstraße, Bützow
- Stalinstraße – now Am Planetarium, Jena
- Stalinstraße – now Chemnitzer Straße, Mölkau
- Stalinstraße – now Eisenberger Straße, Hermsdorf
- Stalinstraße – now Straße des Friedens, Wurzen
- Stalinstraße – now Thomasstraße, Greiz
- Stalinstraße – now Schweriner Straße, Ludwigslust
- Stalinstraße – now Bernhardstraße, Sonneberg
- Stalinstraße – now Fritz-Hesse-Straße, Dessau

==== Hungary ====
- Sztálin út (Stalin Street) – now Andrássy út, Budapest

==== Poland ====
- Ulica Józefa Stalina (Joseph Stalin Street) – now ulica Dworcowa, Gliwice
- Ulica Józefa Stalina – now ulica Główna, Łódź
- Ulica Józefa Stalina – now ulica Lwowska, Tarnów
- Aleja Stalina (Stalin Avenue) – now Aleje Ujazdowskie, Warsaw
- Ulica Marszałka Stalina (Marshal Stalin Street) – now ulica Jedności Narodowej, Wrocław
- Ulica Józefa Stalina – now ulica Lipowa, Białystok
- Aleja Stalina (Stalin Avenue) – now Aleja 23 stycznia, Grudziądz
- Plac Józefa Stalina (Joseph Stalin Square) – now Revival Square, Szczecin

==== Romania ====
- Bulevardul I.V. Stalin (J.V. Stalin Boulevard) – now Bulevardul Aviatorilor, Bucharest
- Piața I.V. Stalin (J.V. Stalin Square) – now Charles de Gaulle Square, Bucharest
- Parcul I.V. Stalin (J.V. Stalin Park) – now Herăstrău Park, Bucharest

==== Yugoslavia ====
Staljingradska ulica(Via Stalingrado) - now Ciottina Ulica(Ciotta street) - Rijeka

- Staljinova ulica (Stalin street) – now Ulica bana Jelačića (Ban Jelačić street), Đakovo
- Staljinova ulica (Stalin street) – now Domobranska ulica, Karlovac
- Staljinova ulica (Stalin street) – now Ulica maršala Tita, Mostar
- Ulica Generalisimusa Staljina (Generalisimus Stalin Street) – now Ulica narodnih heroja, Novi Sad
- Bulevar generalisimusa Staljina (Generalisimus Stalin Boulevard) – now Europska avenija (partly) and Kapucinska ulica (partly), Osijek
- Staljinova ulica (Stalin street) – now Prvomajska ulica, Zemun

=== Soviet Union ===
==== Belarus ====
- Prospekt imeni Stalina (Проспект имени Сталина, Stalin Avenue), 1952–1961 – now Prospekt Nezavisimosti (Проспект Независимости, Independence Avenue), Minsk

==== Estonia ====
- Stalingradi väljak (Stalingrad Square) – now Tornide väljak (Towers' Square), Tallinn
- Stalini tänav (Stalin Street) – now Lossi tänav (Castle Street), Kuressaare
- Stalini tänav – now Vestervalli tänav (Vestervalli Street), Narva
- Stalini väljak (Stalin Square) (1940–1960) – now Viru väljak (Viru Square), Tallinn
- Stalini väljak – now Kesklinna park (City Park), Võru

==== Georgia ====
- სტალინის ქუჩა, (Улица Сталина, Stalin Street), Gori (Stalin's birthplace)
- Tbilisi: Stalin Embankment (Georgian: სტალინის სახელობის სანაპირო), renamed Zviad Gamsakhurdia Embankment in 2004
- სტალინის ქუჩა, (Улица Сталина, Stalin Street), Tsnori

==== Latvia ====
- Staļina iela (Stalin Street), 1940–1941 – now Lielā iela (Main Street), Jelgava

==== Russia ====
- Ulitsa Stalina, (Улица Сталина, Stalin Street) – formerly Friendship Street, Beslan
- Prospekt Stalina, (Проспект Сталина, Stalin Avenue) – now Ulitsa 50 Let Pobedy

=== Western Europe ===
==== Austria ====
- Stalinplatz (Stalin Square), 1946–1956 – Schwarzenbergplatz, Vienna

==== France ====
- Rue Staline (Stalin Street), Essômes-sur-Marne
- Boulevard de Stalingrad, Issoudun
- Boulevard de Stalingrad, Le Grand-Quevilly
- Rue de Stalingrad, Paris
- Place de la Bataille-de-Stalingrad, Paris
- Place de Stalingrad (Bordeaux)

==== Italy ====
- Via Stalin (Stalin Street), Campobello di Licata
- Via Stalin, Raffadali

==== Netherlands ====
- Stalinlaan – now Vrijheidslaan, Amsterdam. Following the liberation of the Netherlands from Nazi occupation in 1945, the city of Amsterdam named three major streets for the World War II Big Three – Churchill, Roosevelt and Stalin – the three streets converging on Victory Square. The first two names remain, but the name of Stalin Street was changed to "Freedom" (Vrijheid) after the Soviet invasion of Hungary in 1956.

==== United Kingdom ====
- Stalin Road, Colchester
- Stalin Avenue, Chatham
- Stalingrad Square, Coventry (now Volgograd Square)

=== Asia ===
==== China ====
- Stalin Street (斯大林大街), Changchun, (1946–1996) The longest street in Northeast China. It was given this name in the aftermath of Operation August Storm, the victorious large-scale Soviet campaign in Manchuria.
- Stalin Square (斯大林广场), Dalian, (1946–1993) This square was given its name for its Stalin statue, which has since been removed.
- Stalin Road, (斯大林路), Dalian
- Stalin Park, (斯大林街), Harbin

==== Iran ====
- Stalin Street, former name of a street in Tehran. The city named three streets after the three leaders – Churchill, Roosevelt and Stalin – that met at the Tehran Conference of 1943. The names all disappeared after the 1979 Islamic Revolution.

==== North Korea ====
- Ssŭttallin kŏri (쓰딸린 거리; Stalin Street) – now Victory Street, Pyongyang

== See also ==
- List of places named after Lenin
- List of renamed cities and towns in Russia
- List of things named after Fidel Castro
- List of things named after Kim Il-sung
- List of places named after Josip Broz Tito
