= Grunwald Square (Szczecin) =

Urban square in Szczecin, Poland

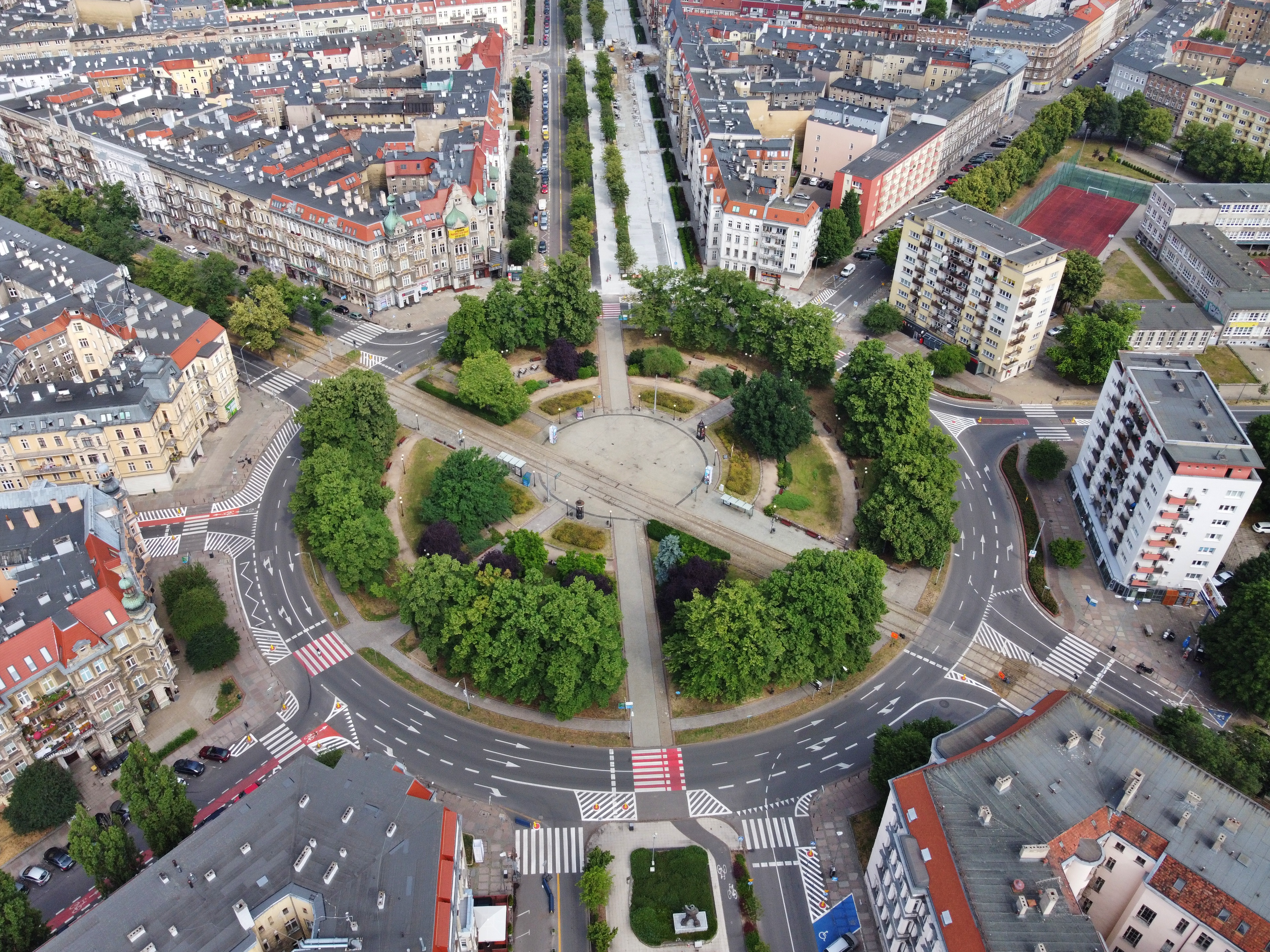
- The Grunwald Square in 2021.

- Location within Poland
- Former name: Emperor William Square (until 1945)
- Type: Urban square
- Location: Szczecin, Poland
- Coordinates: 53°25′58.0″N 14°32′52.0″E
- North: Pope John Paul II Avenue; Śląska Street; Rayski Street
- East: Piłsudski Street
- South: Pope John Paul II Avenue; Śląska Street; Rayski Street
- West: Piłsudski Street

Construction
- Completion: 1880s

The Grunwald Square (Polish pronunciation: [ˈɡrun.valt]; Polish: Plac Grunwaldzki) is a circular urban square in Szczecin, Poland, within the Centre neighbourhood in the Downtown district. It forms a roundabout at the intersection of Pope John Paul II Avenue, Piłsudski Street, Rayski Street, and Śląska Street. The Grunwald Square is surrounded by historic tenement houses dating to the end of the 19th century, mostly built in the eclectic style, as well as modernist apartment buildings constructed in 1965. It was developed the 1880s.

== Toponomy ==
It is named after the village of Grunwald in Warmian–Masurian Voivodeship, Poland, the location of the Battle of Grunwald, fought in 1410 during the Polish–Lithuanian–Teutonic War. The name was given to it on 15 July 1945, on the 535th anniversary of the battle. Prior to this, it was known as the Emperor William Square (German: Kaiser-Wilhelm-Platz), after William I, the German Emperor from 1871 to 1888. He was also the namesake of the Emperor William Street (German: Kaiser-Wilhelm-Straße), currently known as Pope John Paul II Avenue, one of the roads intersecting at the square. When originally proposed, the location was listed as the Westend Church Square (German: Westend Kirchplatz) in the urban development plans until 1877. It would be named after the nearby neighbourhood of Westend, now known as Łękno.

== History ==
The Grunwald Square (then the Emperor William Square) at the beginning of the 20th century.

The urban square was first envisioned in the 1860s, when it was included in the plans for an urban development of the area to the north of the city downtown, now part of the Old Town neighbourhood. It would have a rectangular shape, and be at an intersection of two important roads, Emperor William Street (German: Kaiser-Wilhelm-Straße) and Friedrich Karl Street (German: Friedrich-Karl-Straße), now known as Pope John Paul II Avenue and Józef Piłsudski Street respectively. They would connect the downtown with residential neighbourhoods of Westend (now Łękno), and Neu Torney (now Nowy Turzyn). At the time, the area housed the Fort William, which belonged to the Prussian military, and following unsuccessful negotiations between it and the city, the plans were put on hold. They were returned to following the deconstruction of the fortifications in 1873, with the area being acquired by the city. In 1874, new plans, based on the original proposal, were approved. Originally, the location was proposed under the name Westend Church Square (German: Westend Kirchplatz), and in 1977, was renamed to the Emperor William Square (German: Kaiser-Wilhelm-Platz), after William I, the German Emperor from 1871 to 1888. The square was constructed in the late 1880s, in the centre of the former Fort William. By the beginning of the 20th century, the representative tenement houses were developed around it, mostly built in the eclectic style.

In 1897, on the axis of Piłsudski Street, around the square, were built the tracks for a tram line, connecting the Grey Ranks Square and the Szczecin Główny railway station. In 1904, it was expanded with another track, and in 1905, the line received number 4. In 1927, the tracks were moved from the street to cross the square. In 1957, the Grunwald Square became one of the stops on the line.

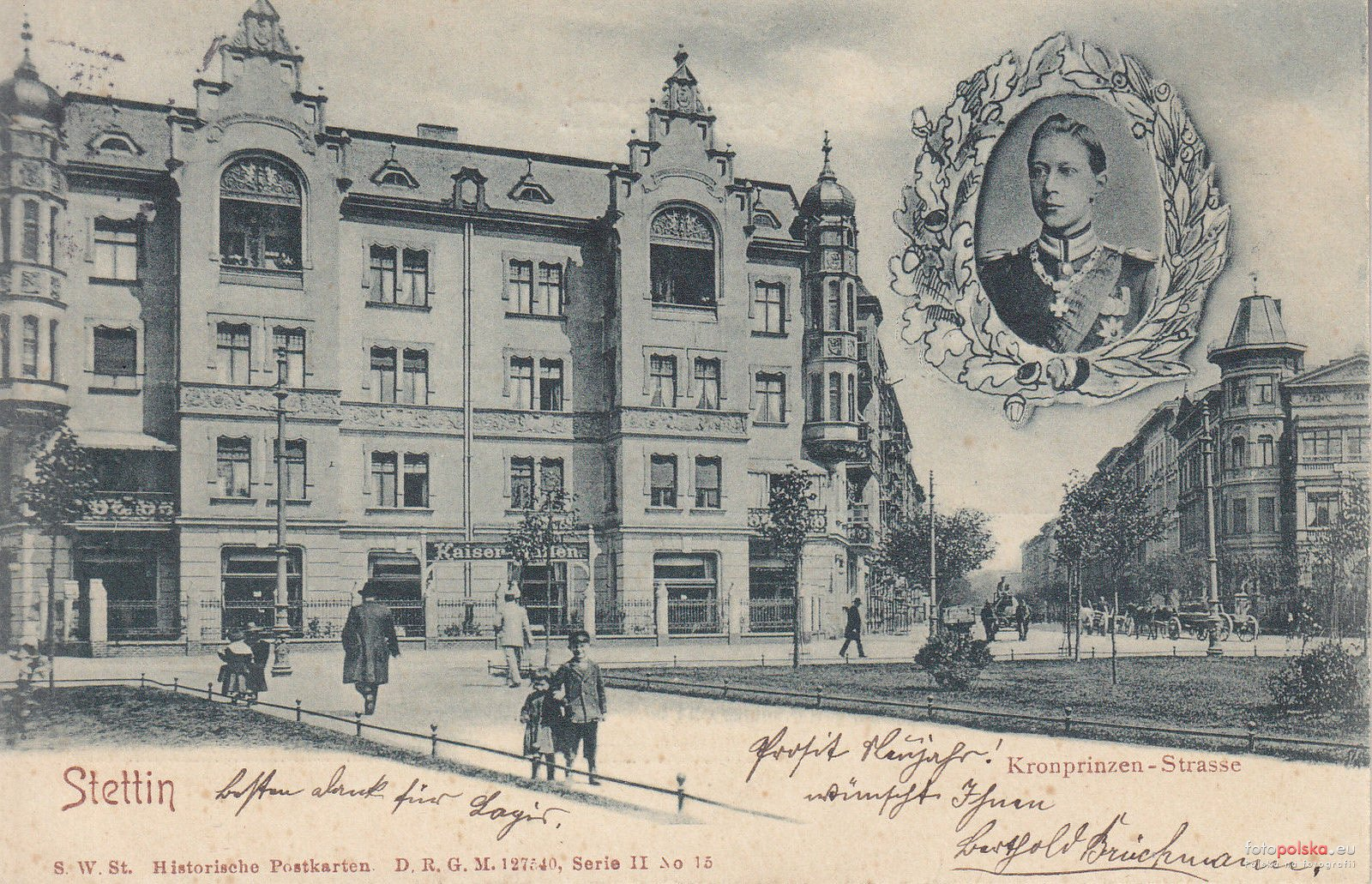
The tenement house at 15 Crown Prince Street in 1900, later destroyed in 1944 during the Second World War.

In 1944, during the Second World War, the buildings between Piłsudski and Rayski Streets, were destroyed in aerial bombings, and the rest were damaged, later being renovated without their ornamentations. In 1945, after the city came under Polish administration, the area around square became the first to be settled with Polish residents, moving in after the war. On 15 July 1945, it was renamed to the Grunwald Square, with the unveiling ceremony of the street sign being held by mayor Piort Zaremba. It was named on the 535th anniversary of the Battle of Grunwald in 1410.

In 1965, two modernist apartment buildings were constructed in place of the destroyed buildings.

In 1980, next to the square, on the axis of Pope John Paul II Avenue, was unveiled the statue of Sailor, a copper statue designed by Ryszard Chachulski. It depicts a helmsman sailor standing behind the ship's wheel. Begging in 2017, it is dressed annually in December as Santa Claus to celebrate Christmas.

== Overview ==
The Grunwald Square has a circular shape, with a road at its boundary, forming a roundabout at the intersection of Pope John Paul II Avenue, Piłsudski Street, Rayski Street, and Śląska Street. It also includes a tram stop, with the tracks crossing it at the axis of Piłsudski Street. The square is surrounded by five historic tenement houses dating to the end of the 19th century, mostly built in the eclectic style, as well as two modernist apartment buildings, constructed in 1965. Next to the square, on the axis of Pope John Paul II Avenue, stands the statue of Sailor, a copper statue designed by Ryszard Chachulski and unveiled in 1980. It depicts a helmsman sailor standing behind the ship's wheel. Every December, it is dressed as Santa Claus to celebrate Christmas.

== Gallery ==
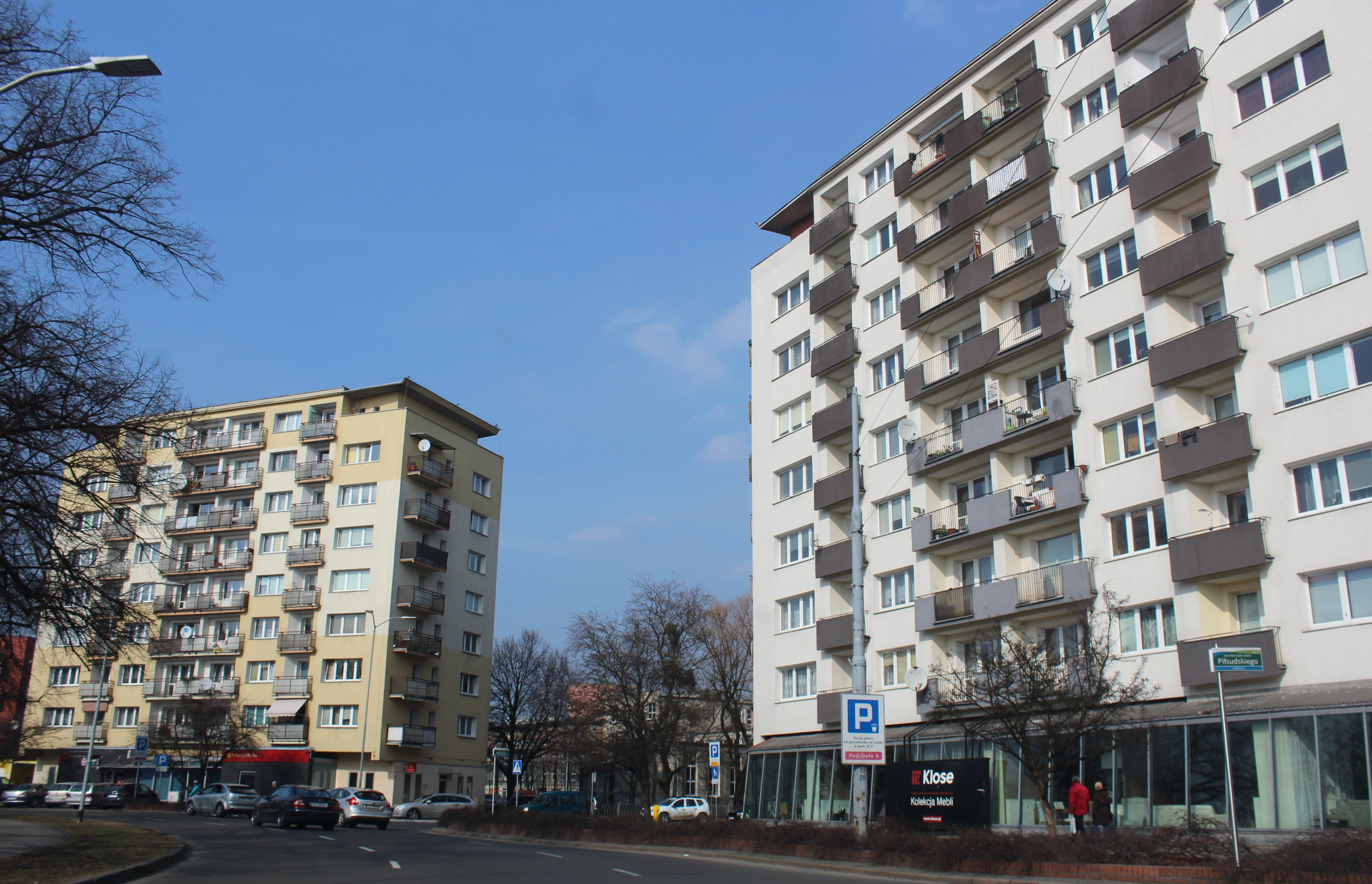
Two modernist apartment buildings at 1–2 and 3–4 Grunwald Square.

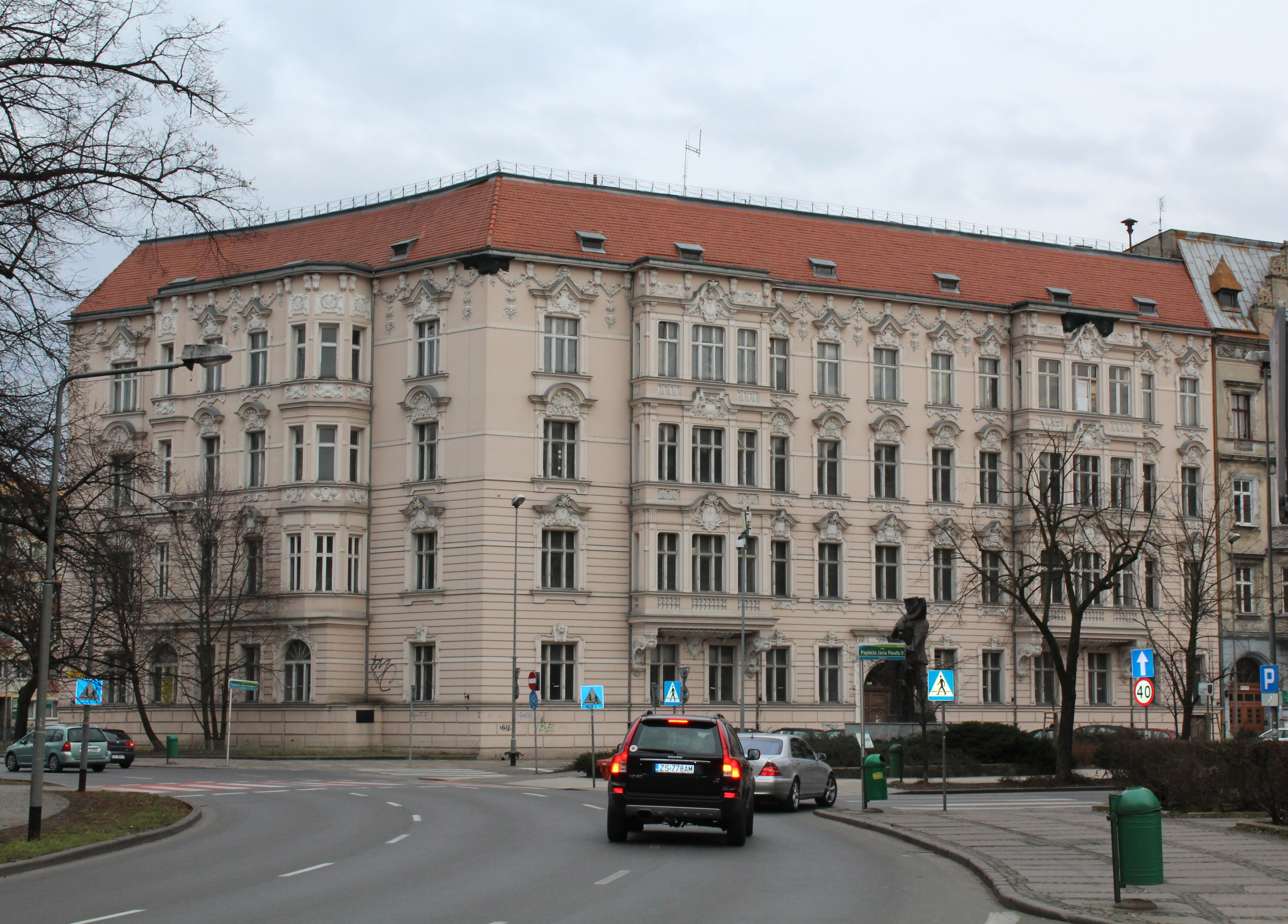
The tenement houses at 12 Pope John Paull II Avenue.

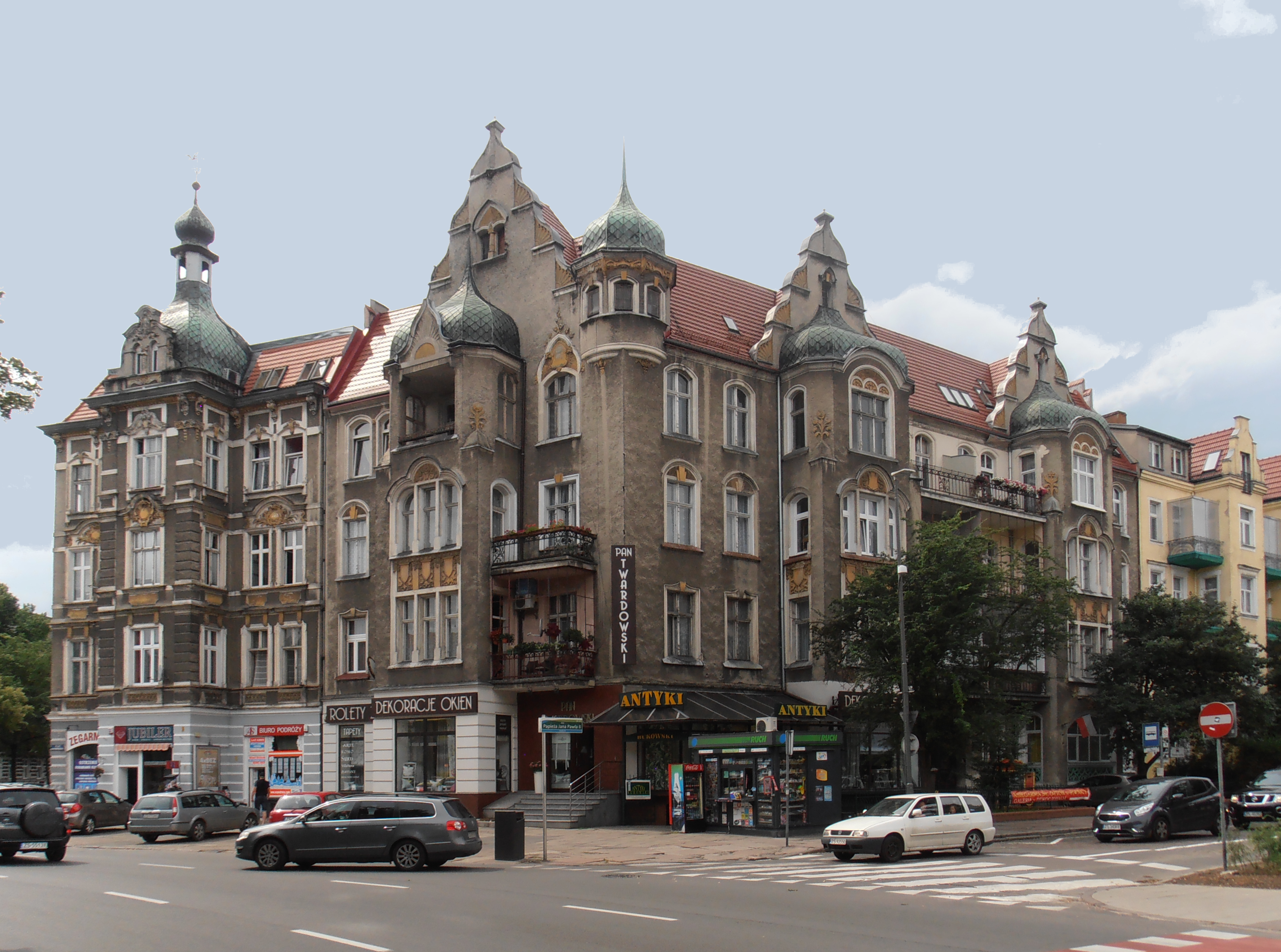
The tenement houses at 41 Pope John Paull II Avenue.

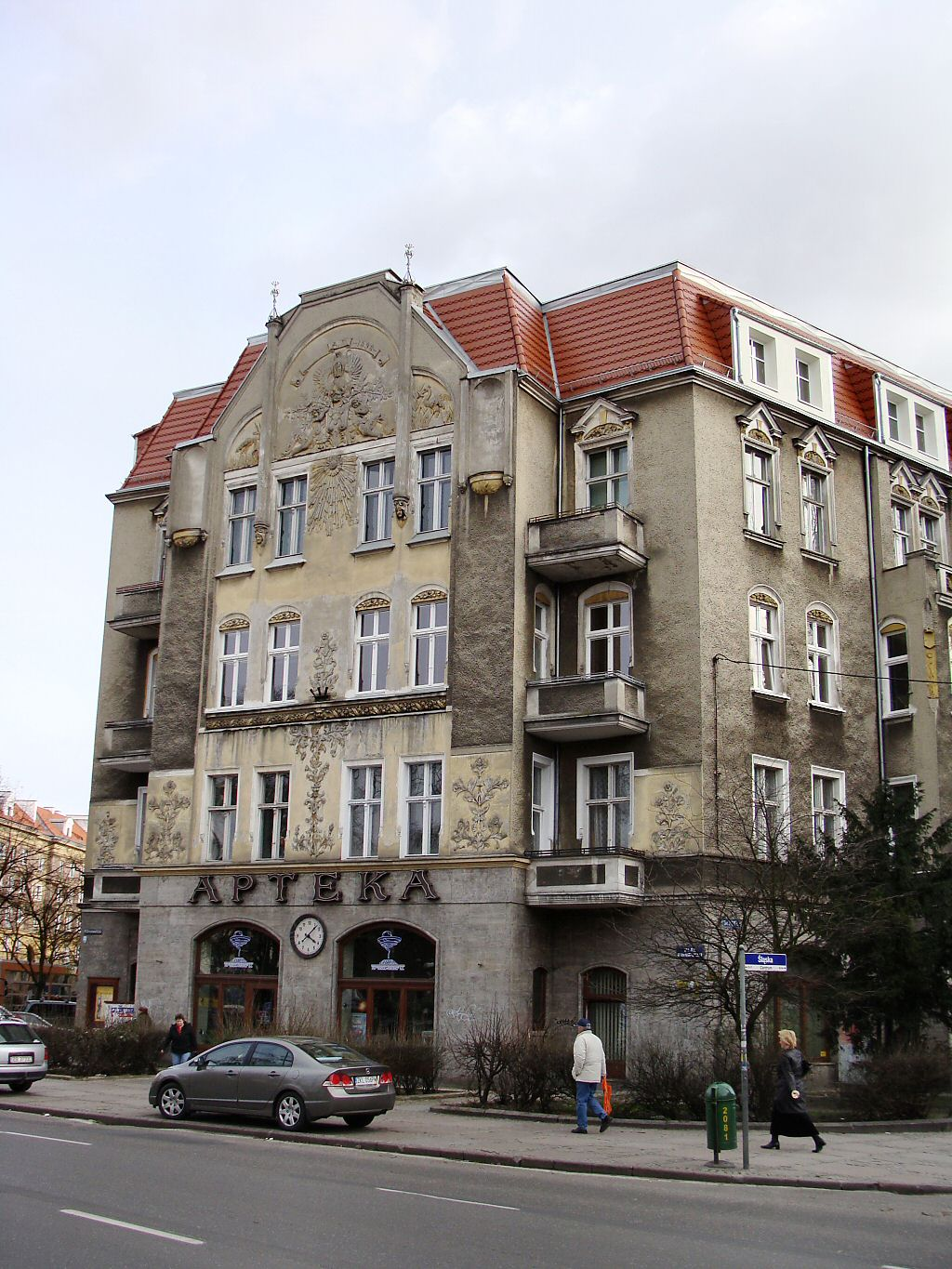
The tenement houses at 43 Pope John Paull II Avenue.

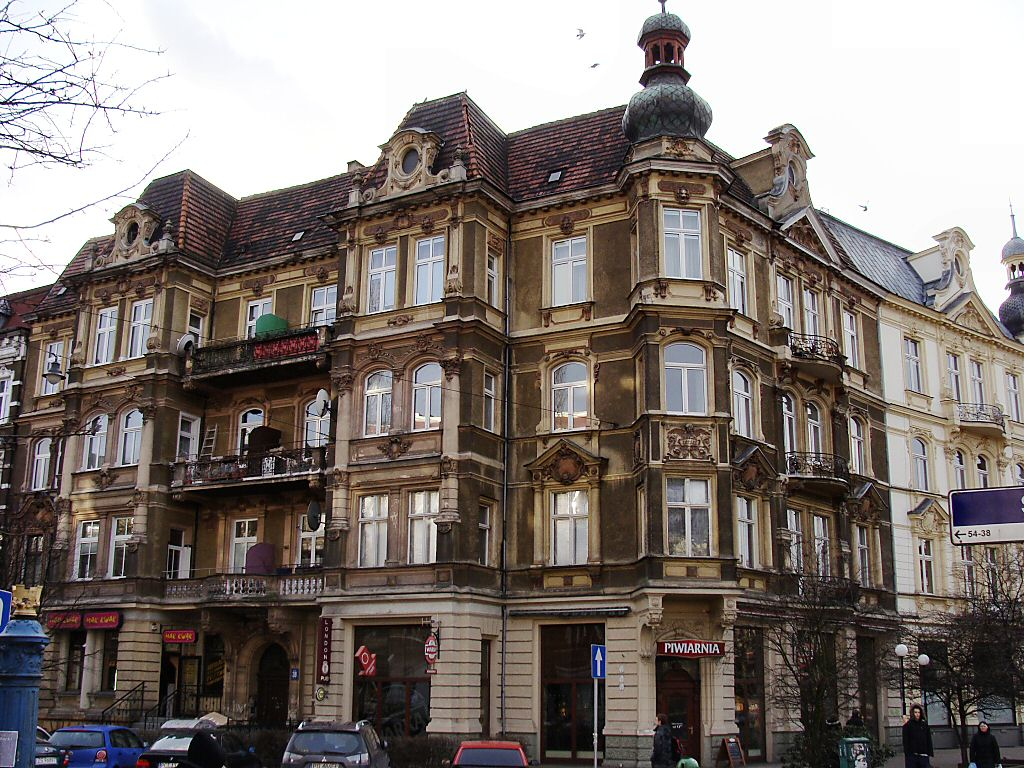
The tenement houses at 38 Śląska Street.

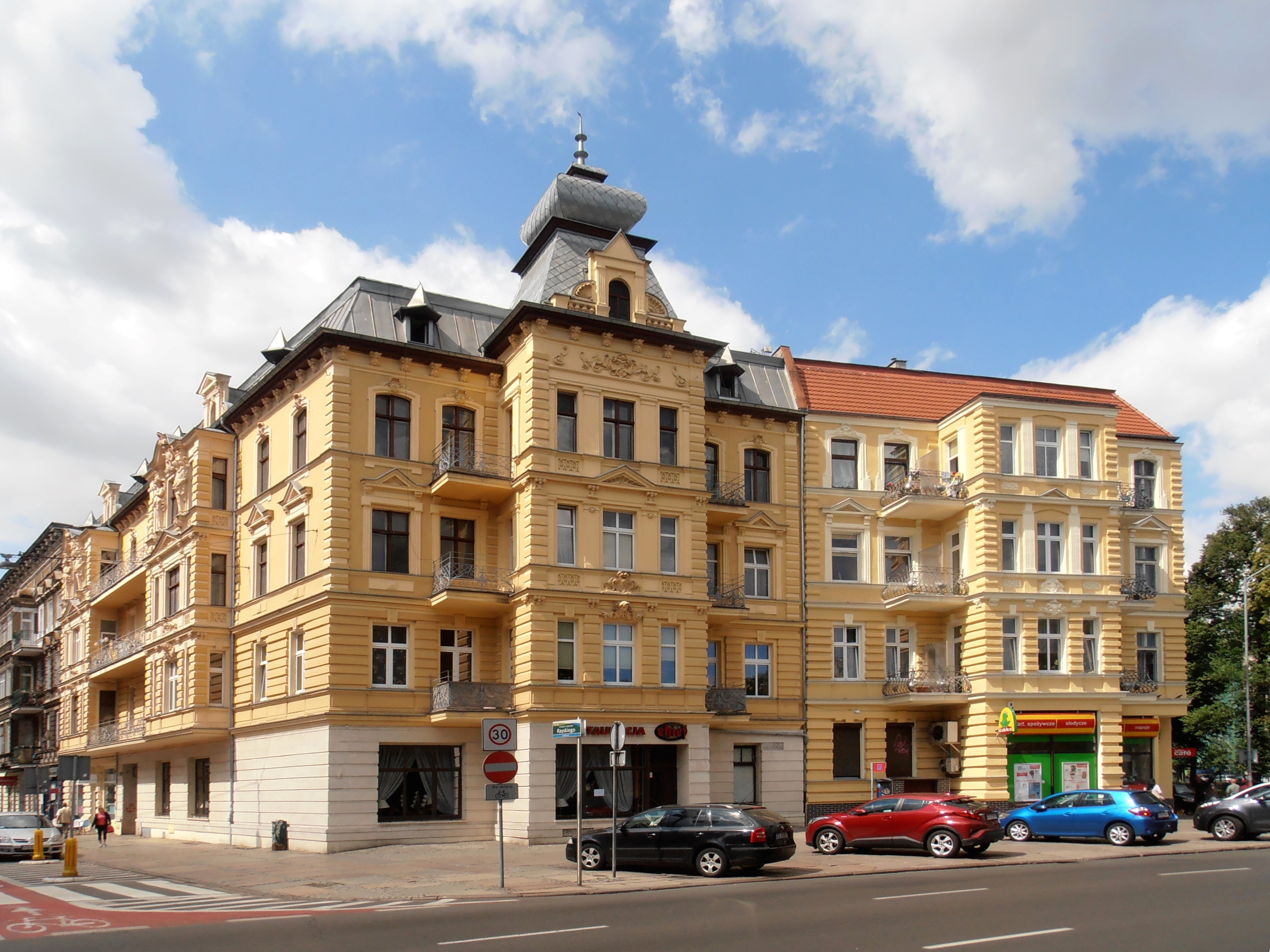
The tenement houses at 16 Rayski Street.

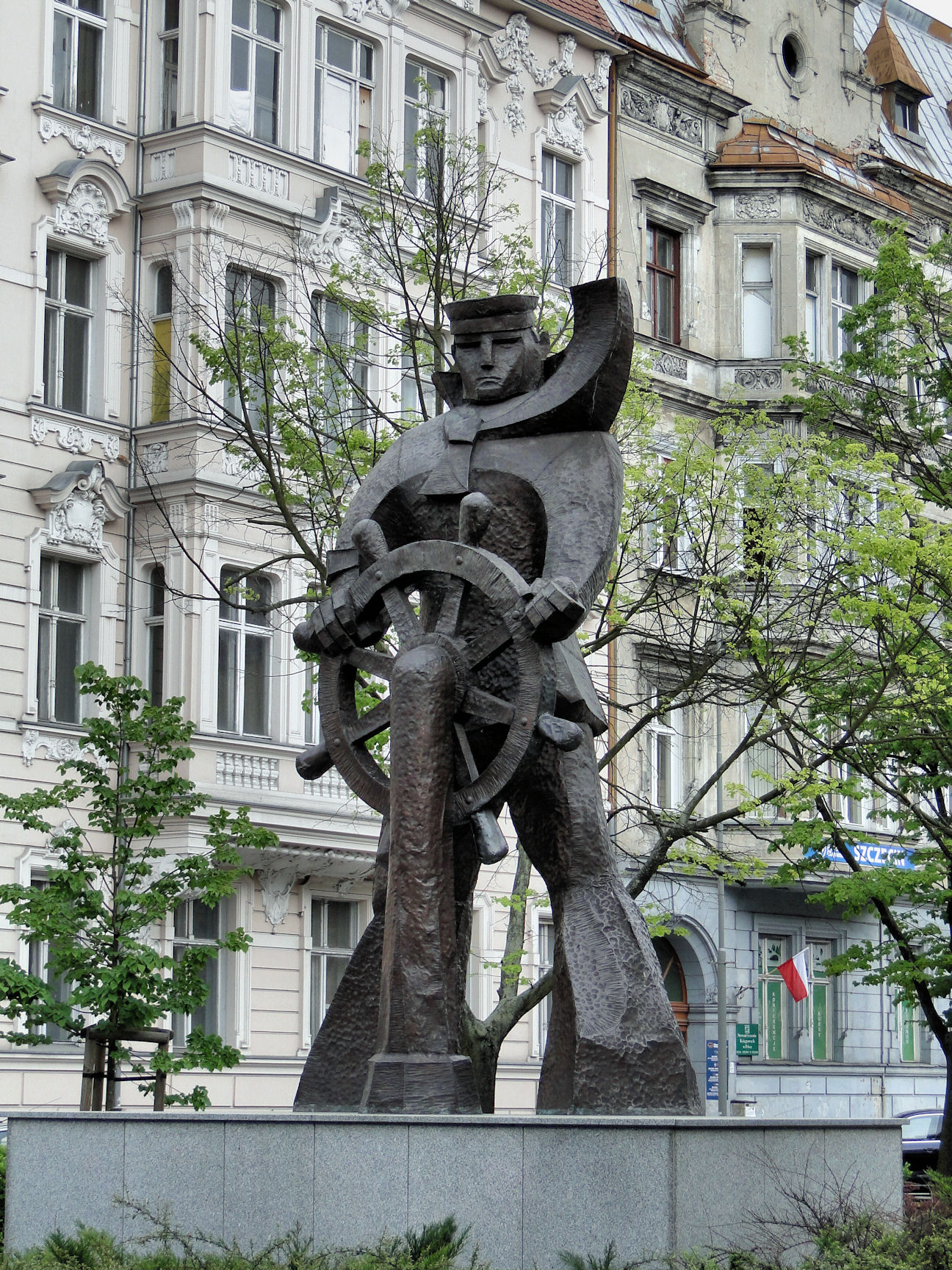
The statue of Sailor.
