= Rodło Square =

Urban square in Szczecin, Poland

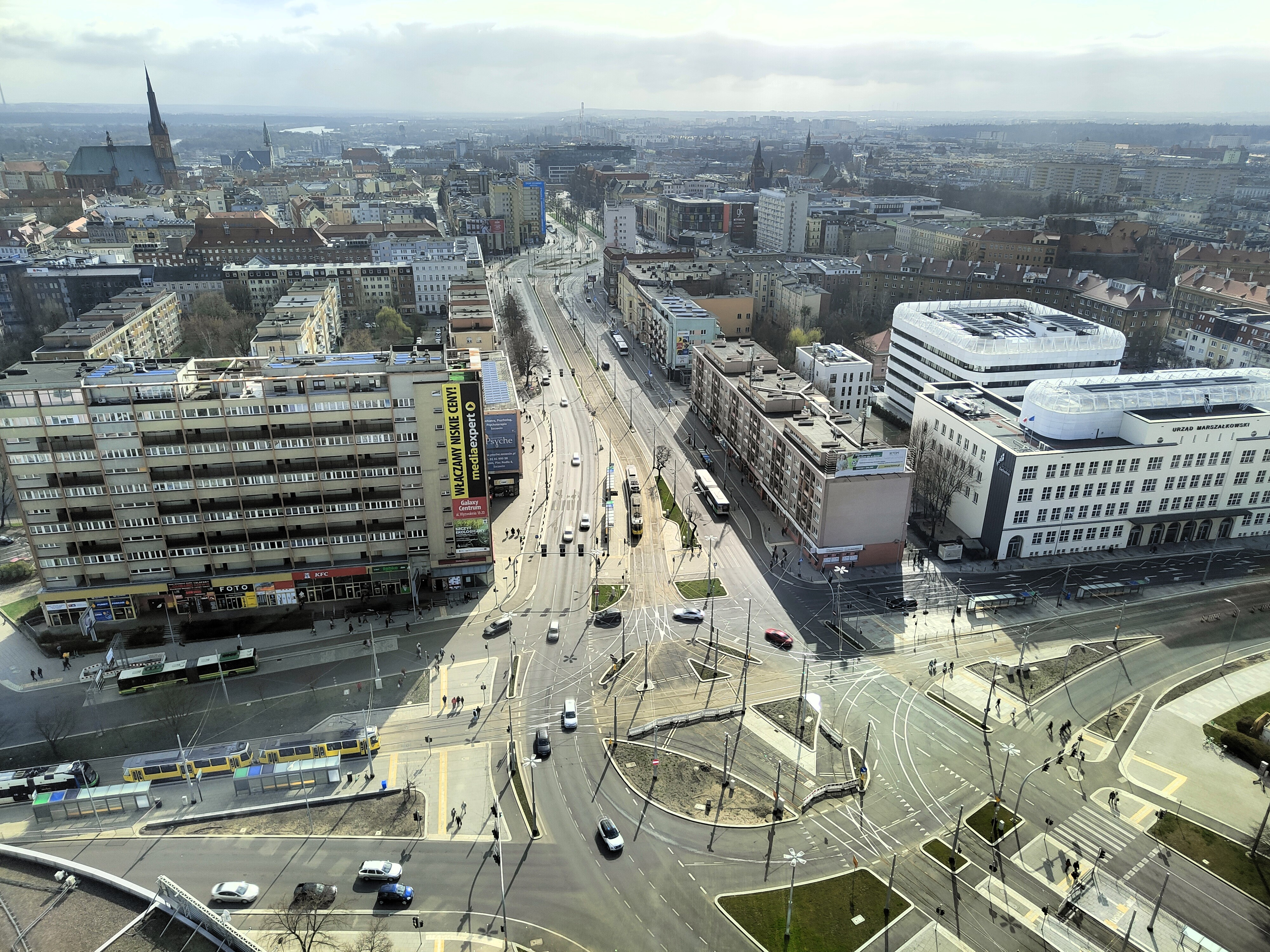
- The Rodło Square in 2022.

- Location within Poland
- Type: Urban square
- Location: Szczecin, Poland
- Coordinates: 53°25′55″N 14°33′18″E
- North: Emancipation Avenue
- East: Piłsudskiego Street
- South: Emancipation Avenue
- West: Piłsudskiego Street

Construction
- Completion: 1970s

The Rodło Square (Polish pronunciation: [ˈrɔ.dwɔ]; Polish: Plac Rodła) is an urban square in Szczecin, Poland. It is located in the neighbourhood of Centre, within the Downtown district, at the intersection of Emancipation Avenue and Piłsudskiego Street. It was constructed in the 1970s.

== Name ==
The square was named after the Rodło, a Polish emblem, first introduced in 1932 by the Union of Poles in Germany.

== History ==
Prior to the World War II, in place of Rodło Square was a small triangular urban square, at the intersection of Friedrich Karl Street (German: Friedrich-Karl-Straße; now Piłsudskiego Street), Moltrke Street (German: Moltkestrasse; now Emancipation Avenue), and Pölitzer Street (German: Pölitzer Straße; now Emancipation Avenue), and surrounned by tenement buildings. The buildings in the area were destroyed in the city bombings during the conflict. After the war, in its place remained an empty area, which was partially developed around 1976, including the formation of the current square at the intersection of Emancipation Avenue and Piłsudskiego Street.

In 1992, next to the square was opened Pazim, the first skyscraper in the city, and one of its tallest buildings.

On 1 March 2024, a 33-year-old man, intentionally drove a car into a crowd of people at the square, with an alleged intent to commit mass vehicular homicide. In the incident 20 people were injured; one later died in hospital.

== Characteristics ==
The square is located at the intersection of Emancipation Avenue, and Piłsudskiego Street. Next to it is located skyscraper Pazim, one of the tallest building in the city. At the square is also placed a rock with a commemorative plaque dedicated to its namesake, the emblem of Rodło.

== Gallery ==
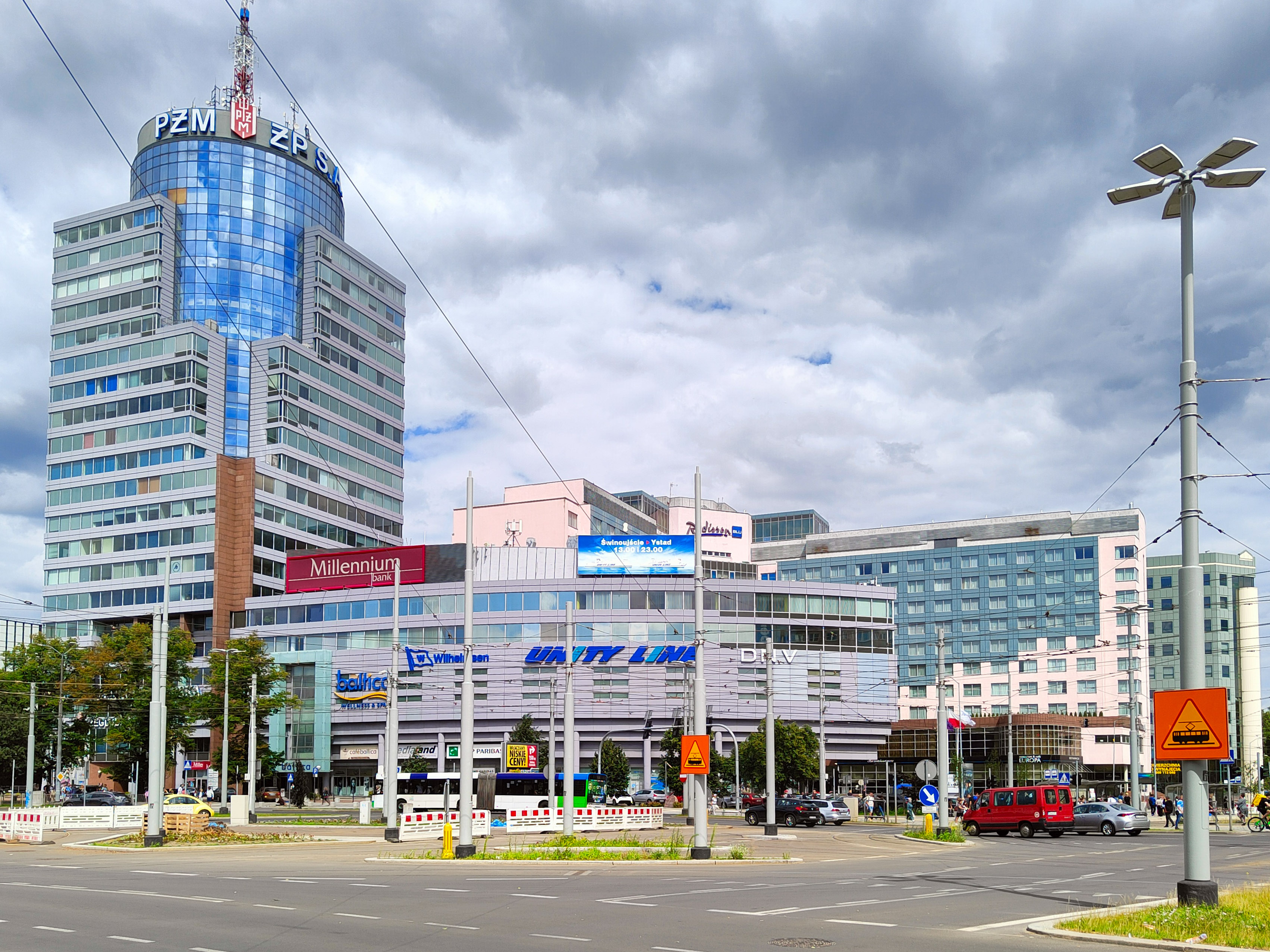
Pazim skyscraper as seen from the square.

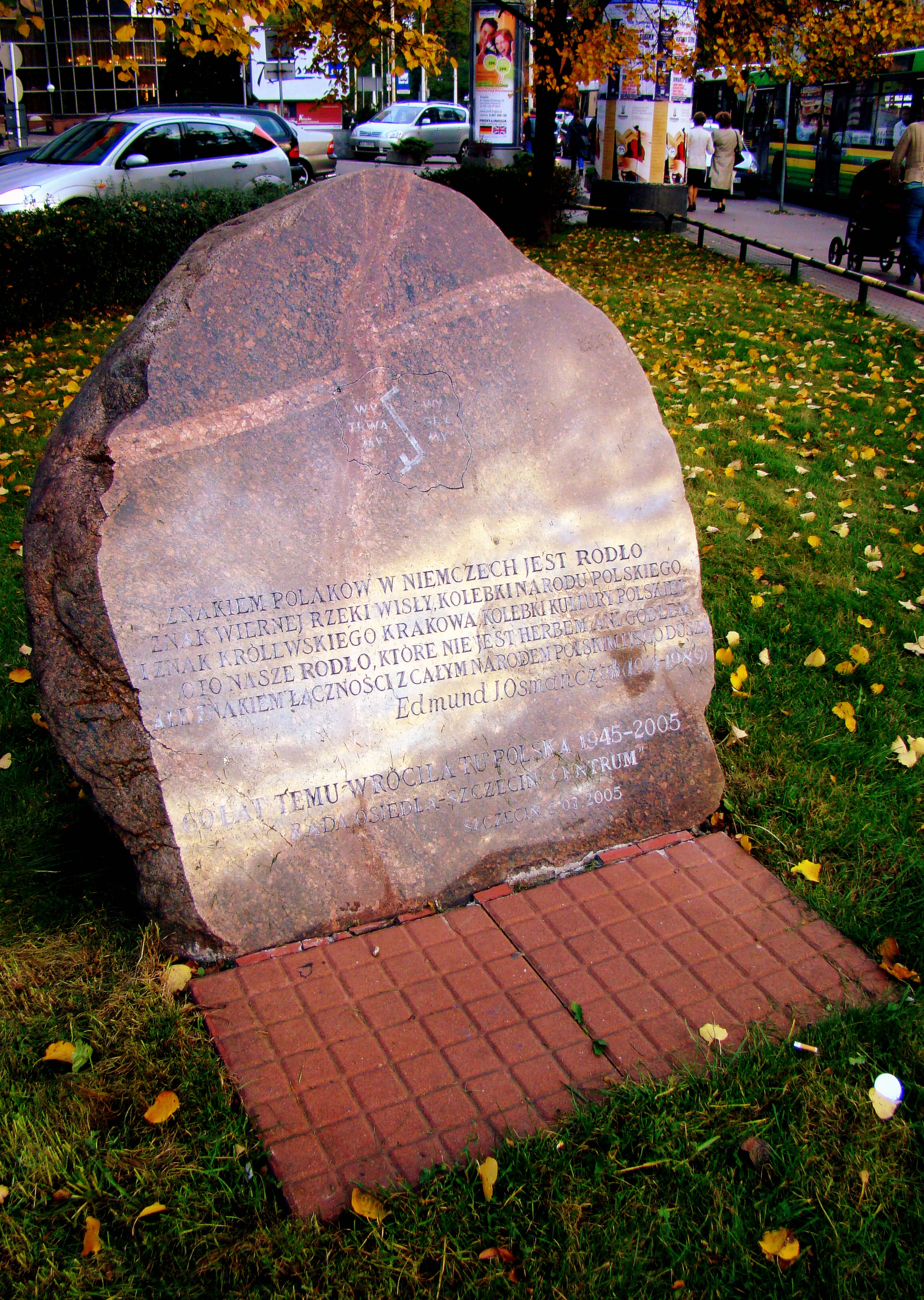
A rock with a commemorative plaque dedicated to the emblem of Rodło.
