= Pazim =

Skyscraper in Szczecin, Poland

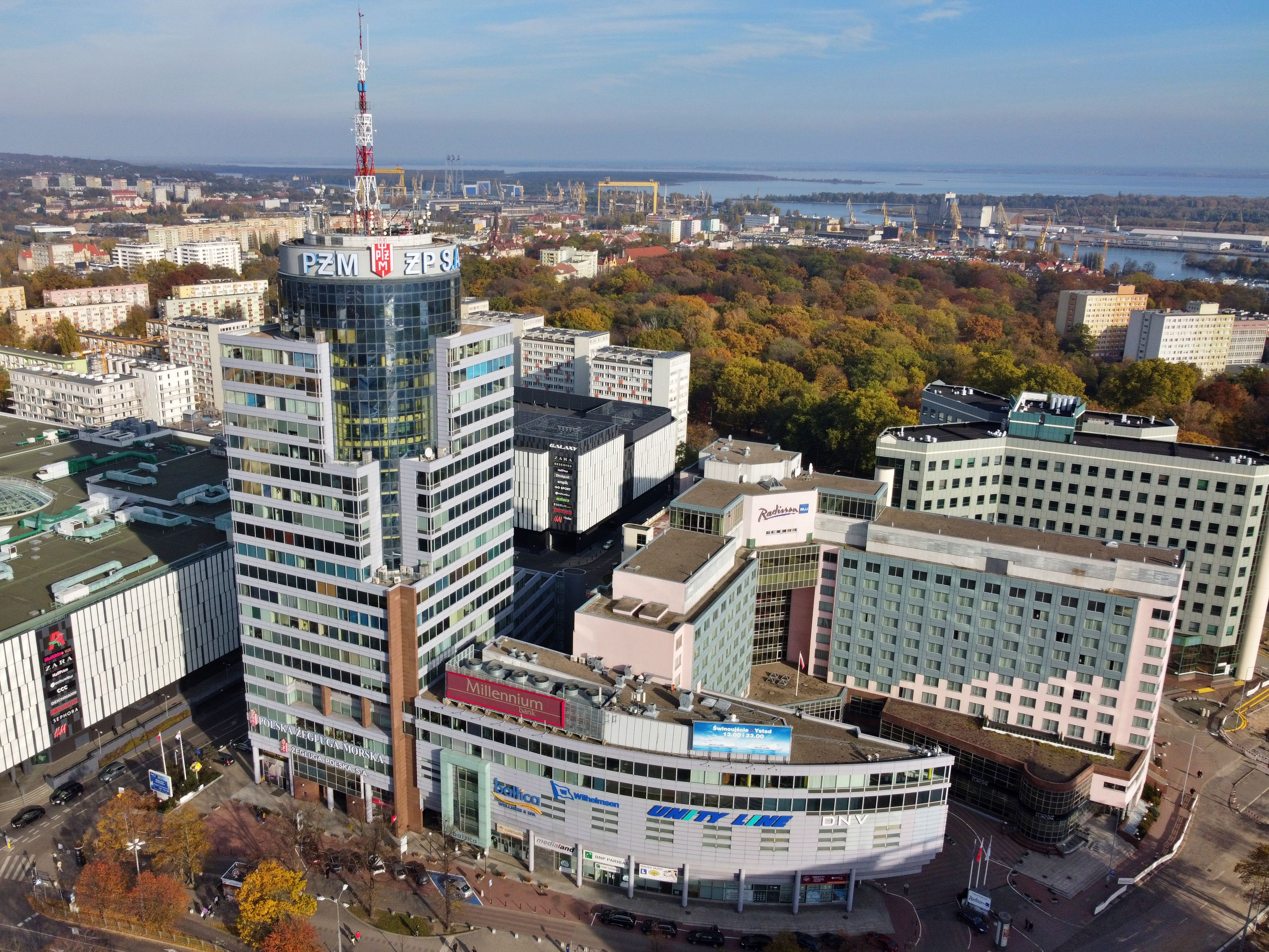
- Pazim in 2021, as seen from Wyzwolenia Avenue.

General information
- Type: Skyscraper
- Location: Szczecin, Poland, 8 Rodło Square
- Coordinates: 53°25′56.12″N 14°33′21.77″E
- Construction started: 12 December 1990
- Completed: 9 November 1992

Height
- Architectural: 128 m
- Roof: 92 m

Technical details
- Floor count: 22
- Floor area: 22,000 m²

Design and construction
- Architect: Miljenko Dumenčić
- Architecture firm: Studio A4
- Developer: Pazim
- Main contractor: Ilbau Polska

Pazim (Polish: [ˈpa.ʑim, ˈpa.zim]), also known as Pazim Center, is a skyscraper in Szczecin, Poland. The building is located in the neighbourhood of Centrum, at 8 Rodło Square, at the intersection of Wyzwolenia Avenue and Piłsudskiego Street. It has the height to the roof of 92 m, and total height, including its radio mast, of 128 m, making it respectively the third tallest, and the tallest building in the city, depending on definition. It was designed by Miljenko Dumenčić, and constructed between 1990 and 1992.

== History ==
Before the World War II, in the location of the current building were located tenement buildings. During the conflict the area was heavily bombarded, leveling the buildings. It remained undeveloped.

The office building was originally proposed in the 1970s, under the name Centrum Zarządzania Flotą (Fleet Management Centre), as a conjoined investment of maritime-related corporations of Polsteam, C. Hartwig, Agencja Morska, Baltona, and Transocean. However, most of them left the project, leaving only Polsteam, which then partnered with Ilbau, that was contracted with its construction. On 16 May 1990, they formed the joined venture company Pazim, to manage it. The former had 74% of shares, while the latter, the remaining 26%. Its name, which also became the name of the building, came from the abbreviation PŻM, which comes from the alternative name of Polsteam, that is Polska Żegluga Morska (Polish Maritime Shipping).

Pazim was designed by the Studio A4 architecture firm, by team led by Miljenko Dumenčić, and including Miro Geng, Stanisław Kondarewicz, and Josip Rukavin. It was constructed by Ilbau Polska between 12 December 1990 and 9 November 1992.

Pazim was the first skyscraper and the tallest building in the city, with the height to the roof of 92 m, and total height, including its radio mast, of 128 m. It partially lost its title in 2008, when St. James the Apostle Archcathedral Basilica was remodelled to the height of 110.18 m.

== Characteristics ==
The building is located in the neighbourhood of Centrum, at 8 Rodło Square, at the intersection of Wyzwolenia Avenue and Piłsudskiego Street. It forms a complex of several conjoined buildings, with the tallest of them being a 22-storey-tall skyscraper. It induces office, shopping, banking and hotel spaces. On its roof is installed a large radio mast, used by numerous radio stations. The building also has an underground two-storey car park. On the top floor operates the Café 22 coffeehouse. The complex has the total area of 22,000 m², of which 15,000 m² is dedicated office spaces. Its architectural height to the roof is 92 m. When, and its total height, including its radio mast, is 128 m. (Note: Some sources list its heights as 83 m and 113 m respectively.) When accounting for the latter, it would be the tallest building in the city, and when former the former, the third tallest building.
