= Grey Ranks Square =

Urban square in Szczecin, Poland

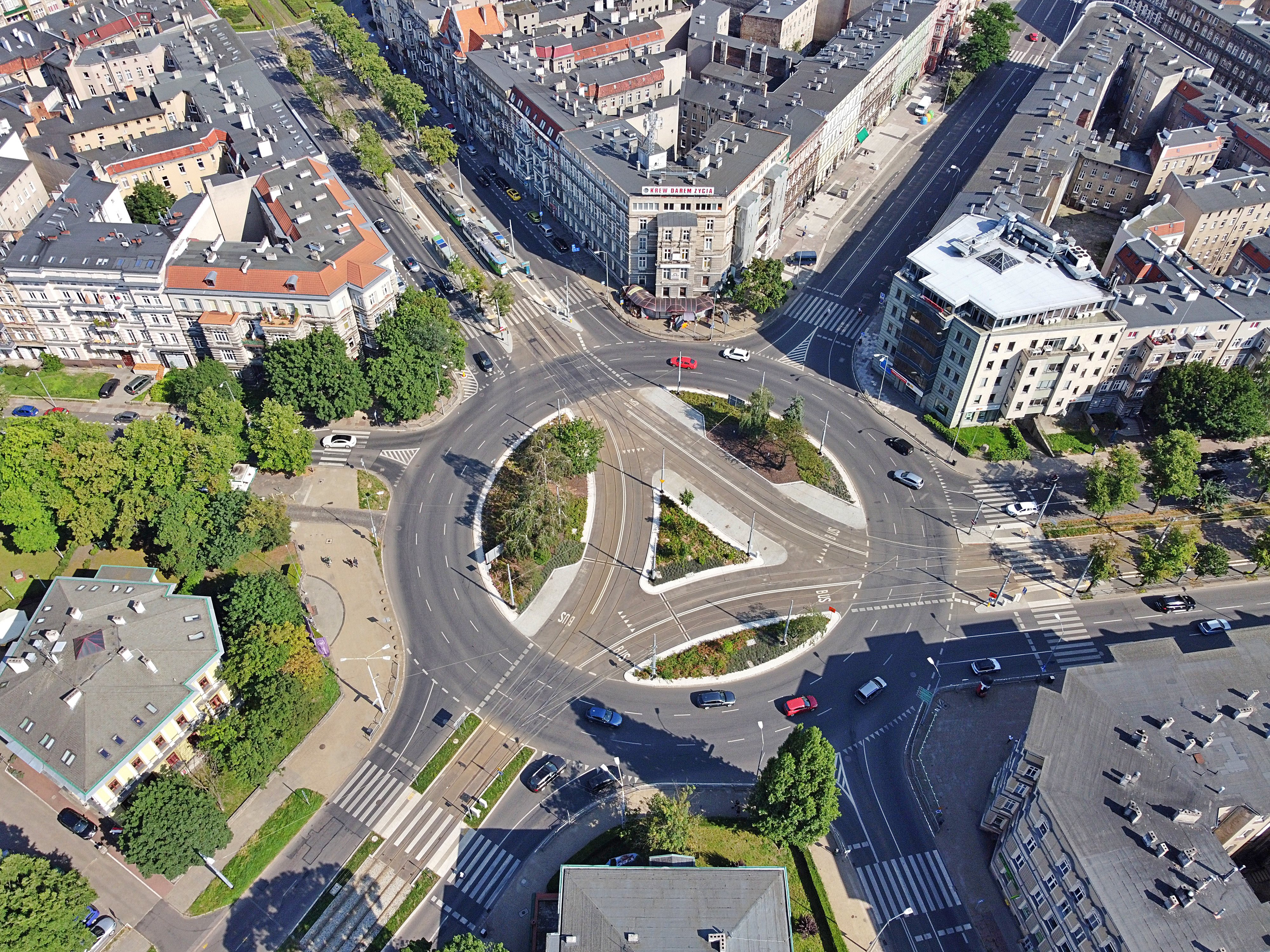
- Grey Ranks Square in 2021.

- Location within Poland
- Native name: Plac Szarych Szeregów (Polish)
- Former names: Arndt Square (1879-45); Allied Square (1945-50); Konstantin Rokossovsky Square (1950-56); Vladimir Lenin Square (1956-91); Allied Square (1991-2009)
- Type: Urban square
- Location: Szczecin, Poland
- Coordinates: 53°25′59.3″N 14°32′24.7″E
- North: Wojska Polskiego Avenue
- East: Piłsudskiego Street; Wielkopolska Street
- South: Piastów Avenue; Wojska Polskiego Avenue
- West: Piątego Lipca Street

Construction
- Completed: 1879

The Grey Ranks Square (Polish: Plac Szarych Szeregów) is an urban square and a roundabout in Szczecin, Poland. It is located at the boundary of neighbourhoods of Centrum and Śródmieście-Północ, within the district of Śródmieście. It forms the intersection of Piastów Avenue, Piątego Lipca Street, Piłsudskiego Street, Wielkopolska Street, and Wojska Polskiego Avenue. The square was designed in 1879.

== History ==
It was designed in 1879, as a circular square with roundabout. At the end of 19th and beginning of the 20th century, around it were constructed tenements, almost all of which, survive to the present day.

It was originally named the Arndt Square (German: Arndtplatz) after Ernst Moritz Arndt, a 19th-century historian, writer and poet. In 1945, it was renamed to the Allied Square (Polish: Plac Sprzymierzonych), and in 1950, to the Konstantin Rokossovsky Square (Polish: Plac Konstantego Rokossowskiego), after a 20th-century military officer who was the Marshal of the Soviet Union, the Marshal of Poland, and the Minister of National Defence. In 1956, it was renamed to the Vladimir Lenin Square (Polish: Plac Włodzimierza Lenina), after a 20th-century communist revolutionary and leader of the Soviet Union, with the name remaining until 1991, when it was reverted to the Allied Square. In 2009 it was renamed to its current name, after the Grey Ranks, an underground paramilitary organisation of the Polish resistance during the Second World War.

On 19 June 2000, there was unveiled the Marshal Józef Piłsudski Memorial, designed by Bohdan Ronin-Walknowski.

== Characteristics ==
The square forms a roundabout on the axis of Wojska Polskiego Avenue. It forms an intersection of Piastów Avenue, Piątego Lipca Street, Piłsudskiego Street, Wielkopolska Street, and Wojska Polskiego Avenue. There is also a triangular intersection of the tram tracks from Piastów Avenue, Piłsudskiego Street, and Wojska Polskiego Avenue. The square is surrounded by historical tenements buildings, dating to the late 19th and early 20th centuries. At the corner of Wojska Polskiego Avenue and Wielkopolska Street is placed the Marshal Józef Piłsudski Memorial, a bronze bust sculpture by Bohdan Ronin-Walknowski.
