= Centrum, Szczecin =

Centrum
- municipal neighborhood
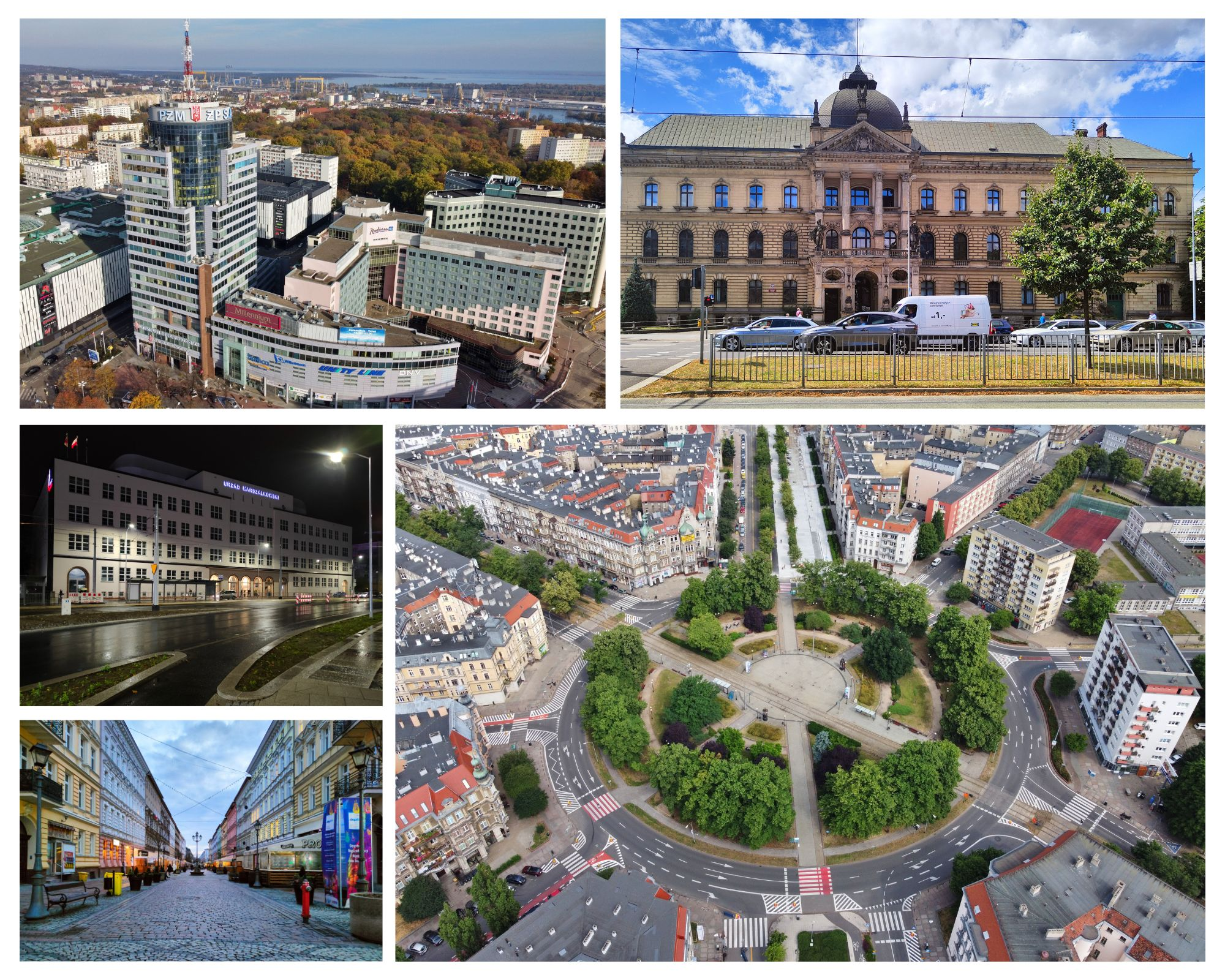

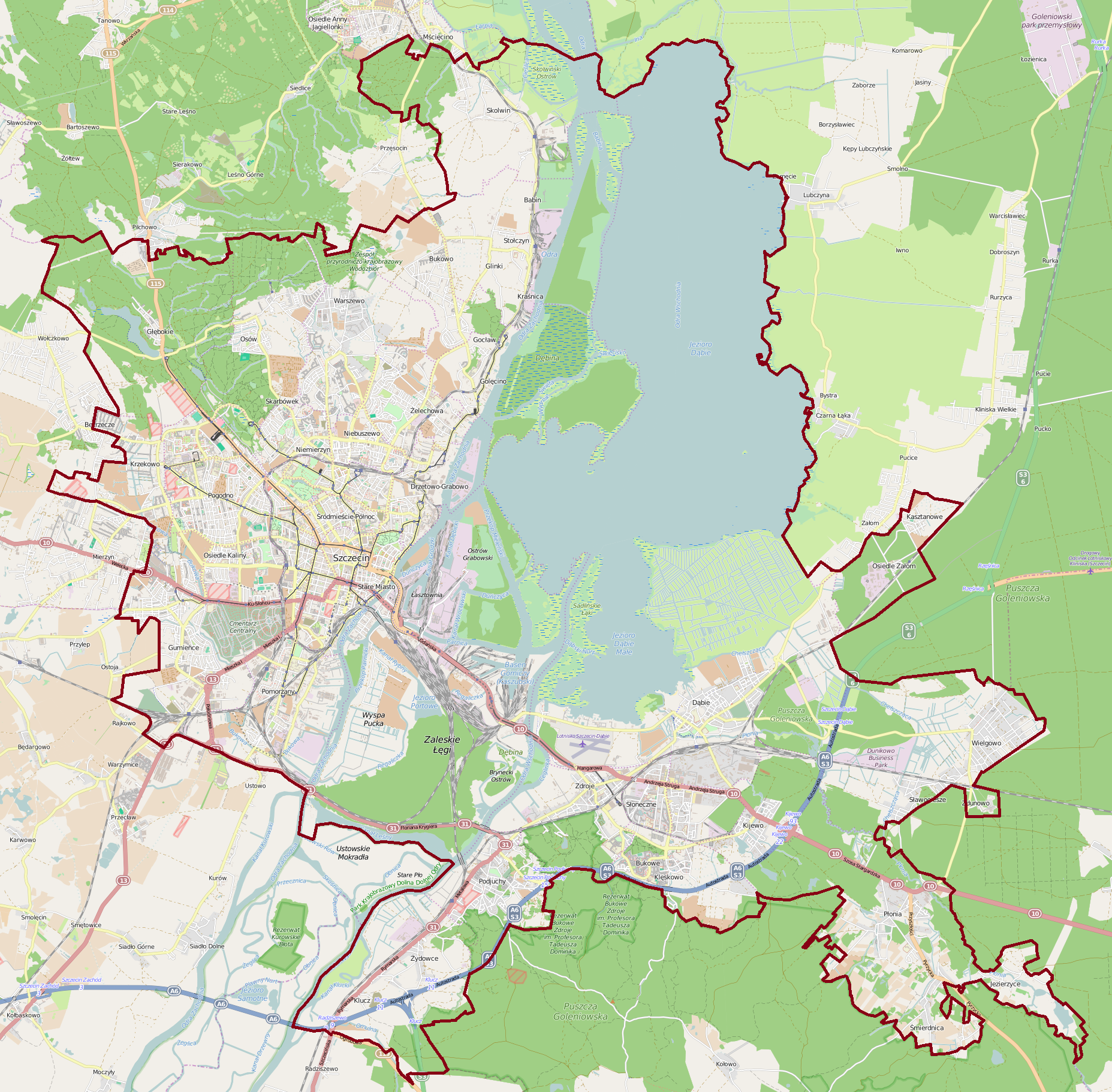
- Location within Szczecin
- Coordinates: 53.4309°N 14.5498°E
- Country: Poland
- Voivodeship: West Pomeranian
- City: Szczecin
- District: Śródmieście
- Established: 1990

Government
  - Body: municipal neighborhood council
  - Chairman: Iwona Balcer

Area
  - Total: 1.03 km^{2} (0.40 sq mi)

Population (2018)
  - Total: 16,364
  - Density: 15,900/km^{2} (41,100/sq mi)
- Time zone: UTC+1 (CET)
  - Summer (DST): UTC+2 (CEST)
- Area code: +48 91
- Car plates: ZS
- Climate: Cfb
- Website: drzetowo-grabowo.osiedla.szczecin.pl

Centrum (Centre) is a municipal neighbourhood of the city of Szczecin, Poland, situated on the left bank of Oder river, in Śródmieście District. It borders Śródmieście-Zachód to the west, Śródmieście-Północ to the north, Stare Miasto to the east, and Nowe Miasto to the south. As of January 2011 it had a population of 21,064.

== See also ==
- Józef Piłsudski Street, Szczecin
