= SS Empire Almond =

World War II merchant ship of the United Kingdom

History
- Name: Empire Almond (1941–41); Marquita (1946-51); Marsland (1951–60); Huta Zgoda (1960–69); MP-Zozie-12 (1969–78)
- Owner: Ministry of War Transport (1941–46); Kaye, Son & Co Ltd (1946–60); Polska Żegluga Morska, Szczecin (1960–c67); Rejonowe Zaklady Zbozowe PZZ (c1967–69); Zaklady Obrutu Zbozami Importawanymi i Eksportowymi PZZ (1969–78)
- Operator: Owner operated except: W P Runciman & Co Ltd (1941–43); Coolham Steamship Co Ltd (1943–46)
- Port of registry: (United Kingdom) Hong Kong (1941–42); (United Kingdom) London (1942–60); (Poland) Szczecin (1960–78)
- Builder: Taikoo Dockyard and Engineering Co Ltd, Hong Kong
- Yard number: 297
- Launched: 23 July 1941
- Completed: September 1941
- Out of service: 10 July 1978
- Identification: UK official number 172790; Call sign VRFR
- Fate: Scrapped in Faslane, July 1978

General characteristics
- Tonnage: 6,860 GRT
- Length: 429 ft 7 in (130.94 m)
- Beam: 56 ft 7 in (17.25 m)
- Depth: 33 ft 5 in (10.19 m)
- Installed power: 292 NHP
- Propulsion: triple expansion steam engine (Taikoo Dockyard & Engineering Co, Hong Kong)
- Speed: 10 knots (19 km/h)

Empire Almond was a 6,860 gross register tons (GRT) cargo ship that was built in 1941. She was renamed Marquita in 1946, Marsland in 1951, Huta Zgoda in 1960 and MP-Zozie-12 in 1969. She was scrapped in 1978.

== History ==
Empire Almond was built by Taikoo Dockyard and Engineering Co Ltd, Hong Kong as yard number 297. She was launched on 23 July 1941 and completed in September 1941. Empire Almond was built for the Ministry of War Transport and initially operated under the management of the W Runciman & Co Ltd, London and later the Coolham Steamship Co Ltd. Empire Almond was initially homeported in Hong Kong but her homeport was changed to London in 1942.

=== War service ===
Empire Almond was a member of a number of convoys during the Second World War.

OS 33

Convoy OS 33 sailed from Liverpool for Freetown, Sierra Leone on 1 July 1942, arriving on 20 July. Empire Almond sailed from the Clyde with a destination of Takoradi, Ghana with a cargo of Government stores.

MKS 52

Convoy MKS 52 departed from Augusta on 13 June 1944. Empire Almond was bound for Malta for attention to defects.

KMS67

Convoy KMS 67 left Liverpool on 24 October 1944 and arrived at Gibraltar on 2 November. Empire Almond was carrying a cargo of stores and general cargo, bound for Alexandria. At 1300 hrs on 26 October, Empire Almond was stopped with an engine fault. It took about 4 hours before she was able to resume her journey. She was escorted by the Captain-class frigateS HMS Bayntun and HMS Foley, rejoining the convoy at 2200 hrs.

MKS 72

Convoy MKS 72 left Lisbon on 23 December 1944. Empire Almond was carrying a cargo of steel.

KMS 85

Convoy KMS 85 left Liverpool on 17 February 1945 and reached Gibraltar on 24 February. Empire Almond sailed from Southend bound for Lisbon.

=== Post-war ===
In 1946 Empire Almond was sold to Kaye, Son & Co, London and renamed Marquita. Marquita visited Auckland, New Zealand on 3 May 1949. She was renamed Marsland in 1951. In 1960, Marsland was sold to the Polska Żegluga Morska, Szczecin and renamed Huta Zgoda. In about 1967 Huta Zgoda was sold to Rejonowe Zaklady Zbozowe PZZ and converted into a grain storage hulk at Gdańsk. In 1969, Huta Zgoda was sold to Zaklady Obrutu Zbozami Importawanymi i Eksportowymi PZZ and renamed MP-Zozie-12. she served in this capacity until 1978. MP-Zozie-12 was sold for scrap in 1978, arriving at Faslane under tow on 10 July.

== Official number and call sign ==
Official numbers were a forerunner to IMO Numbers.

Empire Almond had the UK Official Number 172790 and Call sign VRFR.
