= HMS Loch Dunvegan =

1944 Loch-class frigate of the Royal Navy

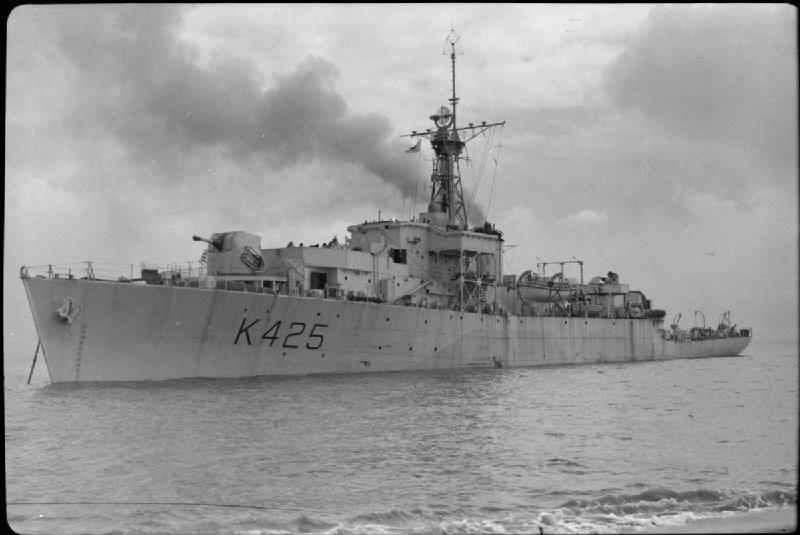
- Loch Dunvegan in August 1944

History

United Kingdom
- Name: Loch Dunvegan
- Namesake: Loch Dunvegan
- Ordered: 19 January 1943
- Builder: Charles Hill & Sons, Bristol
- Yard number: 297
- Laid down: 29 September 1943
- Launched: 25 March 1944
- Completed: 25 June 1944
- Commissioned: June 1944
- Decommissioned: April 1947
- Recommissioned: 1 May 1950
- Decommissioned: November 1953
- Identification: Pennant number K425/F425
- Honours and awards: Arctic, 1944; North Sea, 1945
- Fate: Sold for scrapping, 1960

General characteristics
- Class & type: Loch-class frigate
- Displacement: 1,435 tons
- Length: 307 ft 9 in (93.80 m)
- Beam: 38 ft 9 in (11.81 m)
- Draught: 8 ft 9 in (2.67 m)
- Propulsion: 2 × Admiralty 3-drum boilers; 2 shafts; 4-cylinder vertical triple expansion reciprocating engines, 5,500 hp (4,100 kW)
- Speed: 20 knots (37 km/h)
- Range: 9,500 nautical miles (17,600 km) at 12 knots (22 km/h)
- Complement: 114
- Armament: 1 × QF 4 inch Mark V on 1 single mounting HA Mk.III**; 4 × QF 2-pounder Mk.VII on 1 quad mount Mk.VII; 4 × 20 mm Oerlikon A/A on 2 twin mounts Mk.V (or 2 × 40 mm Bofors A/A on 2 single mounts Mk.III); Up to 8 × 20 mm Oerlikon A/A on single mounts Mk.III; 2 × Squid triple barreled A/S mortars; 1 rail and 2 throwers for depth charges

HMS Loch Dunvegan was a Loch-class frigate of the British Royal Navy, named after Loch Dunvegan in Scotland. Launched in 1944, the ship saw service in the Second World War, and in the Mediterranean Fleet in the early 1950s, before being broken up in 1960.

== Design and construction ==
The Loch class was designed to meet the requirement for large numbers of long-range escorts for the Royal Navy. They were a development of the earlier River class, but designed for mass production, with pre-fabricated sections to be built by general engineering companies and assembled at shipyards. Anti-submarine armament and sonar was also significantly improved.

The ships were 307 ft 0 in (93.57 m) long overall and 286 ft 0 in (87.17 m) between perpendiculars, with a beam of 38 ft 6 in (11.73 m), and a draught of 12 ft 4 in (3.76 m). Displacement was 1,435 long tons (1,458 t) standard and 2,260 long tons (2,300 t) deep load. The ships were powered by two 4-cylinder triple expansion steam engines fed with steam from two Admiralty 3-drum boilers and rated at 5,500 indicated horsepower (4,100 kW). This gave a speed of 19.5 knots (36.1 km/h; 22.4 mph). Sufficient fuel was carried to give a range of 4,800 nautical miles (8,900 km; 5,500 mi) at 15 knots (28 km/h; 17 mph) in tropical waters.

The ships' main gun armament was a single QF 4-inch (102 mm) Mk V gun forward, with an anti-aircraft armament of a quadruple 2-pounder (40 mm) pom-pom aft and at least six Oerlikon 20 mm cannon (two twin powered mountings and at least two single mounts). Two Squid anti-submarine mortars were fitted, with 120 rounds carried, backed up by 15 conventional depth charges. Type 147B and Type 144 sonars were fitted, while Type 277 radar detected surface and air targets. As built, the ship had a complement of 114 officers and men.

The ship was ordered on 19 January 1943 as the third of her class, and was laid down at Charles Hill & Sons' Bristol shipyard on 29 September 1943. Loch Dunvegan was launched on 25 March 1944 by the wife of the shipyard owner, as the first ship of her name to serve with the Royal Navy. The ship completed fitting out on 25 June 1944, with a construction time of 274 days.

== Service history ==
=== Second World War ===
Commissioning in June 1944 with the pennant number K425, the ship was allocated for service in the 10th Escort Group based on the Clyde. In August she was attached to the 20th Escort Group to prepare for Russian convoy duty, but on 12 August 1944 (Note: English states that the collision happened on 20 August, but both Boniface and Ruegg & Hague state that Loch Dunvegan formed part of the escort of convoy JW 59 from 15 August.) was in collision with the destroyer Bulldog. While Loch Dunvegan was quickly repaired, Bulldog was more severely damaged, and did not return to service until September that year. On 15 August Loch Dunvegan left Loch Ewe as part of the close escort for Convoy JW 59 to Murmansk. On 24 August Loch Dunvegan, together with the destroyer Keppel and the sloops Mermaid and Peacock took part in the sinking of the German submarine U-354. The next day the convoy arrived at Kola Inlet and Loch Dunvegan was detached to prepare for the return convoy, and left the Kola Inlet on 28 August with Convoy RA 59A for the return journey.

On 5 September 1944 Loch Dunvegan rejoined the 10th Escort Group based at Londonderry Port, to serve in convoy and anti-submarine operations in the North Atlantic. From 11 December 1944, the ship was refitted on the Tyne, resuming operations in the North Atlantic on completion of the refit in January 1945. In February 1945, the 10th Escort Group was deployed to patrol the Faroe–Shetland Channel to stop German submarines using it as a transit route to the Atlantic. On 14 February 1945, the Escort Group was patrolling north of Shetland when the frigate Bayntun detected a submarine using sonar. Baynton, Braithwaite, Loch Dunvegan and Loch Eck carried out a series of attacks, with wreckage and two survivors coming to the surface after Loch Dunvegan carried out three attacks with her Squid motor. The survivors died shortly after being picked up but confirmed that U-989 had been sunk. Loch Dunvegan's commanding officer was awarded the Distinguished Service Cross as a result of this action. In March the Group was transferred to the English Channel to continue operations against U-boats.

=== Post-war ===
After the German surrender in May 1945 the ship was transferred to the Rosyth Escort Force where she was employed in Air-Sea Rescue duty in the Atlantic, and in June 1945 supported re-occupation operations in Norway. In August 1945 Loch Dunvegan was transferred to the 1st Anti-Submarine Training Flotilla based at Londonderry. In late 1945, the frigate ran aground in Lough Foyle and was under repair in Belfast until April 1946 when she returned to service with the 4th Training Flotilla at Londonderry. Loch Dunvegan was decommissioned and placed in reserve at Devonport in April 1947.

In 1948 the ship's pennant number was changed from K425 to F425. Loch Dunvegan was refitted at Penarth in Wales from January to May 1949, before returning to reserve.

=== Mediterranean Fleet, 1950s ===
On 27 February 1950, Loch Dunvegan began another refit at Devonport, which continued until 1 May that year when the ship recommissioned for service with the 2nd Frigate Flotilla of the Mediterranean Fleet, but her departure was delayed owing to sabotage of the ship's machinery by a member of her crew, and the frigate did not leave for Malta until 26 June. The usual programme of exercises and visits followed, including a period as Guard ship at Aqaba in September 1950. In February 1951, Loch Dunvegan was carrying out exercises with the fleet when macinery problems forced her to withdraw from the exercises and be towed to Gibraltar for repair, arriving there on 24 February. On 27 April 1951, the frigate was still undergoing repair/refit at Gibraltar when the ammunition ship RFA Bedenham was destroyed in an explosion. Loch Dunvegan's crew went to the aid of the injured. In May 1951 she returned to Malta to rejoin the 2nd Frigate Flotilla, but when entering Mellieħa, she grounded, sustaining extensive damage, including the loss of propeller blades. Loch Dunvegan' s commanding officer was dismissed from the ship in the resulting court martial. Further repairs took until September, and on her return to service, the ship was involved in a series of collisions in Sliema creek, including one with the destroyer Saintes. In January–February 1952 Loch Dunvegan was deployed as Guardship at Port Said, and provided shore parties in support of the military authorities after widespread anti-British riots. Flotilla duties and exercises then occupied her until September 1952 when the frigate served another stint as guardship at Port Said before leaving for the United Kingdom in October 1952.

On the ship's return to British waters, Loch Dunvegan was placed in reserve at Devonport returned to the UK. She was refitted at Devonport in January to March 1954, before returning to reserve, and underwent a more extensive 8 month refit at Charles Hill in Bristol, her original builders, from March 1955. After completion, the ship was again laid up in reserve, this time at Penarth.

Loch Dunvegan remained in reserve at Penarth until 1960 when she was sold for scrapping at Thos. W. Ward of Briton Ferry, where the ship arrived under tow on 24 August 1960.

== Bibliography ==
- Boniface, Patrick (2013). Loch Class Frigates. Maritime Books. ISBN 978-1-904459-54-5.
- Colledge, J. J.; Warlow, Ben (2006) [1969]. Ships of the Royal Navy: The Complete Record of All Fighting Ships of the Royal Navy from the 15th Century to the Present (3rd Rev ed.). London: Chatham Publishing. ISBN 978-1-86176-281-8. OCLC 67375475.
- Critchley, Mike (1992). British Warships Since 1945. Vol. Part 5: Frigates. Liskeard, UK: Maritime Press. ISBN 0-907771-13-0.
- Elliott, Peter (1977). Allied Escort Ships of World War II: A complete survey. London: Macdonald and Jane's Publishers. ISBN 0-356-08401-9.
- English, John (1993). Amazon to Ivanhoe: British Standard Destroyers of the 1930s. Kendal, UK: World Ship Society. ISBN 0-905617-64-9.
- Friedman, Norman (2008). British Destroyers & Frigates: The Second World War and After. Barnsley: Seaforth Publishing. ISBN 978-1-84832-015-4.
- Gardiner, Robert; Chesneau, Roger, eds. (1980). Conway's All the World's Fighting Ships 1922–1946. Greenwich, UK: Conway Maritime Press. ISBN 0-85177-146-7.
- Kemp, Paul (1997). U-Boats Destroyed: German Submarine Losses in the World Wars. London: Arms & Armour Press. ISBN 1-85409-321-5.
- Ruegg, Bob; Hague, Arnold (1993). Convoys to Russia 1941–1945. Kendal, UK: World Ship Society. ISBN 0-905617-66-5.
