= Stanisław Sołdek =

Polish engineer, labour worker (1916–1970)

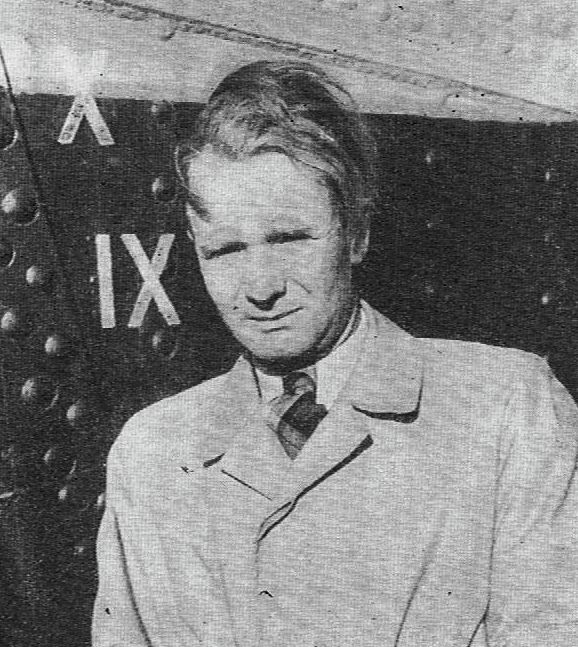
- Born: 12 May 1916; Oleksów
- Died: 15 June 1970 (aged 54); Gdańsk
- Occupation: Shipyard worker

Stanisław Sołdek (12 May 1916 – 15 June 1970) was a Polish shock worker, labor leader, a Gdańsk Shipyard marker, and a graduate of the Gdańsk University of Technology.

Stanisław Sołdek was born in 1916 in the village of Oleksów near Radom, from where, at the age of two, he moved with his family to Nowy Dwór Mazowiecki. Before World War II, he worked at the Modlin Shipyard of Państwowe Zakłady Inżynierii. He was also an employee of the Płock River Shipyard in Radziwi. After the war, he moved to Gdańsk. In the years 1952–1956 he was a member of the Sejm of the first term on behalf of the Polish United Workers' Party. After completing his secondary education, in 1950 he began studies at the Shipbuilding Department of the Gdańsk University of Technology, and in 1956 he became a master of ship engineer. In May 1963, he was appointed managing director of the Wisła Shipyard.

== Awards and recognition ==
Stanisław Sołdek was awarded, among others, the Order of the Banner of Labor, First Class, the Bronze, Silver and Gold Cross of Merit, the Gold Medal of Merit of the Sea Worker and the Badge of Honor of the Honorary Shipyard Worker of the People's Republic of Poland.

The first Polish ship built after World War II, the SS Sołdek, was named after him.
