= HMS Bayntun =

1943 Captain-class frigate of the Royal Navy

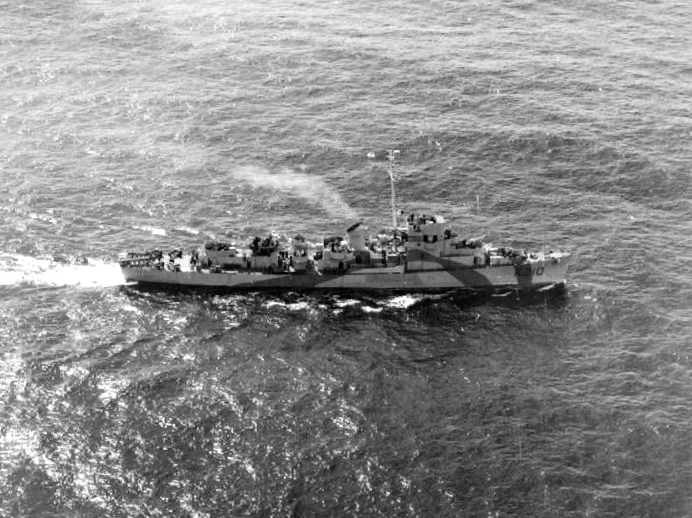
- HMS Bayntun (K310) at sea in 1943

History

United States
- Name: Bayntun
- Namesake: Henry William Bayntun
- Awarded: 1 November 1941
- Builder: Boston Navy Yard
- Laid down: 5 April 1942
- Launched: 27 June 1942
- Fate: Transferred to Royal Navy, 20 January 1943

United Kingdom
- Name: Bayntun
- Commissioned: 20 January 1943
- Decommissioned: 14 June 1945
- Home port: Derry, Northern Ireland
- Identification: Pennant number: K310
- Fate: Returned to USN at Harwich, 22 August 1945

United States
- Name: Bayntun
- Commissioned: 22 August 1945
- Decommissioned: 19 October 1945
- Stricken: 1 November 1945
- Identification: Hull classification symbol: DE-1
- Fate: Sold for scrapping, 17 June 1947

General characteristics
- Class & type: Captain-class frigate Royal Navy; Evarts-class destroyer escort US Navy
- Displacement: 1,140 long tons (1,158 t) (light); 1,430 long tons (1,453 t) (full load)
- Length: 289 ft 6 in (88.24 m) oa; 283 ft 6 in (86.41 m) wl
- Beam: 35 ft (11 m)
- Draft: 10 ft (3.0 m)
- Installed power: 4 × GM Model 16-278A diesel engines; 6,000 shp (4,500 kW)
- Propulsion: 2 × electric drive; 2 × screws
- Speed: 19 knots (22 mph; 35 km/h)
- Range: 4,150 nmi (4,780 mi; 7,690 km) at 12 kn (14 mph; 22 km/h)
- Complement: 175
- Armament: 3 × 3-inch (76 mm)/50 caliber MK.22 guns; 2 × 40 mm Bofors guns; 6 × 20 mm Oerlikon cannons; 1 × Hedgehog anti-submarine mortar; 4 × Mk6 depth charge projectors; 2 × Mk9 depth charge tracks

Service record
- Part of: 44th Escort Group, Western Approaches Command
- Victories: U-757 (1944); U-327, U-989, U-1278 (1945)

USS Bayntun (DE-1) was the first of the American built lend lease Captain-class frigates in the Royal Navy as HMS Bayntun (K310). She was named for Henry William Bayntun.

== History ==
=== Construction and transfer ===
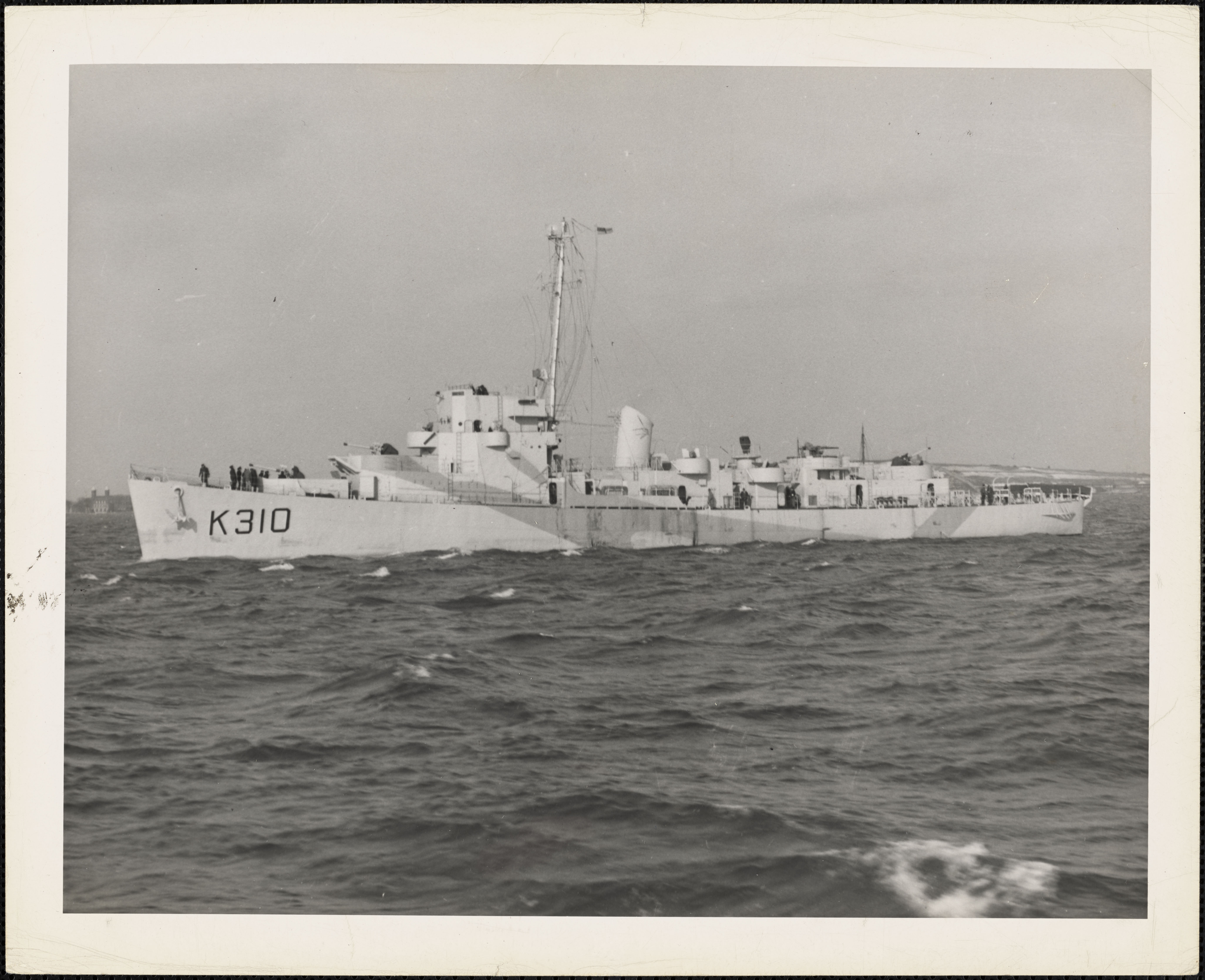

Bayntun was laid down on 5 April 1942, at the Boston Navy Yard; launched on 27 June 1942; transferred to the Royal Navy under lend lease on 20 January 1943. She was given the pennant number K310 and departed Boston the following month, bound via New York, for the Royal Naval Dockyard in the British Imperial fortress colony of Bermuda to conduct her "working up."

Allocated to the 44th Escort Group, part of the Western Approaches Command, Bayntun and her sister ship Bazely sailed on 2 April 1943 for Chesapeake Bay where they were to load stores for transportation to the United Kingdom. However, Bayntun returned to Bermuda to pick up men from her crew who had been quarantined there due to scarlet fever before she sailed for England and ultimately got underway on 15 April for the British Isles, in company with Berry. The two Captain-class frigates reached Derry, Northern Ireland, on 23 April.

=== Service with Royal Navy ===
Assigned to Escort Group B 4, operating from Londonderry, Bayntun underwent voyage repairs at Liverpool in May before she sailed for Bermuda. Next shifting northward from Bermuda, Bayntun joined the screen for convoy HX 250 and sailed from New York on 30 July. The warship escorted two merchantmen, SS Biscaya and SS Bruarfoss, detached from the convoy, to Iceland before she herself proceeded on to Belfast. In his autobiography, Capt. John Treasure Jones describes a different series of events. He states that he took command of Bayntun at Derry on 19 June 1943, where he was attached to a Liverpool-based escort group. He was allocated as an additional escort to this group for the outward passage, with instructions to proceed to Boston on completion, to have new bearings fitted to the diesel engines, as they were badly worn. He states that the ship was powered by diesel electric motors and able to do 21 knots. (On 30 June he was promoted to Commander RNR.) She remained at Boston under repair in dry dock for four weeks and then returned to Britain as an additional escort with another convoy. On 29 August Capt Treasure Jones relinquished command of Bayntun and was given command of the frigate Dart. In September, an accident in Bayntun's forward motor room caused extensive damage and flooding, and the resultant repairs kept her in the yard at Belfast until 6 December.

Leaving Belfast, she rejoined Escort Group B 4 at Londonderry. Five days into 1944, the frigate departed her home base as part of the screen for convoy OS 64. The escorts detected the presence of an enemy submarine on 6 January and gave chase. Bayntun located the U-boat in the fading daylight and carried out three attacks, joined by the Canadian corvette HMCS Camrose which made five. Bayntun recovered wreckage coated with light diesel oil and pronounced the attack successful. She was indeed correct for U-757 had perished, victim of the joint attack launched by Bayntun and Camrose.

Reaching Gibraltar on 17 January, Bayntun departed "The Rock" on 22 January and arrived back at her home base on 2 February. Bayntun remained in port for voyage repairs and enjoyed a brief respite from convoy duty before heading back to Gibraltar on 13 February. During this voyage, she again made contact with a U-boat, attacking on 10 March in the Bay of Biscay during the search for the attacker that had torpedoed and sunk the corvette Asphodel the previous day. These attacks, made in concert with the corvette Clover, failed; and Bayntun returned to Londonderry on 13 March.

Over the next few months, Bayntun remained engaged in the prosaic but important duties of a convoy escort. In August, she was involved in an operation coded "CX" designed to counter inshore operations by U-boats. On 1 September, Bayntun took part in the hunt for the killer of Hurst Castle, a corvette that had been torpedoed 11 miles (18 km) north of Tory Island, but the search yielded no result.

With the disbandment of Escort Group B 4, Bayntun was assigned to Escort Group 10, retaining Londonderry as her base of operations. On 27 October, she was detailed to shepherd SS Empire Almond, a straggler from Convoy KMS 67 from U-boats known to be in the vicinity and carried out attacks against a suspected U-boat. Again no wreckage appeared to suggest a successful attack. On 21 November 1944, Bayntun, on channel patrol, recovered the bodies of four sailors who had been lost with the trawler, HMS Transvaal that had gone down earlier in the English Channel.

The year 1945 was to prove a successful one for the hunting and killing of U-boats. Sailing for Scapa Flow in late January, Bayntun teamed with the frigates Braithwaite and Loch Eck on 3 February and sank U-327. During her next voyage, commencing at Scapa Flow on 9 February, Bayntun detected a U-boat on 14 February, called for help from Brathwaite, Loch Dunvegan, and Loch Eck, and together they sank U-989, rescuing six survivors. Three days later, Bayntun and Loch Eck pooled their resources to destroy U-1278.

Joining the Portsmouth patrol on 11 March, Bayntun made contact with a U-boat 10 days later, but the ensuing attack was not successful. In company with Loch Eck on 25 March, Bayntun investigated a reported U-boat sinking and, on 26 April, took part in what she thought to be a successful search for a U-boat. However, records of lost German submarines do not list any losses for that date.

After hostilities ended in Europe, Bayntun formed part of the escort for eight U-boats which sailed from Stavanger, Norway, to Scotland on 27 May 1945. Three days later, when the little convoy reached its destination, Bayntun proceeded to Bergen, Norway, for her second escort mission. Reaching Scapa Flow on 4 June, she then proceeded to Rosyth, Scotland, where she became an escort for the "Apostle" convoy that sailed the following day.

=== Return to United States and fate ===
Reduced to reserve, Category "B", on 14 June 1945, Bayntun was returned to US Navy custody at Harwich, England, on 22 August 1945.

Commissioned the same day, Bayntun (DE-1) had as her commissioning crew the former ship's company of the reverse Lend-Lease frigate USS Fury that had earlier that day been returned to the Royal Navy. Bayntun departed The Downs on 29 August, sailing for the United States with Task Group (TG) 21.3. She reached the Philadelphia Navy Yard on 8 September 1945. Bayntun was decommissioned at Philadelphia on 19 October 1945, and her disposal was ordered on 30 October. Her name was struck from the Navy list on 1 November, and she was sold to Thomas Harris Barker of New Jersey on 17 June 1947 for scrapping.
