= SS Sołdek =

Retired Polish freighter

Coordinates: 54°21′05″N 18°39′32″E

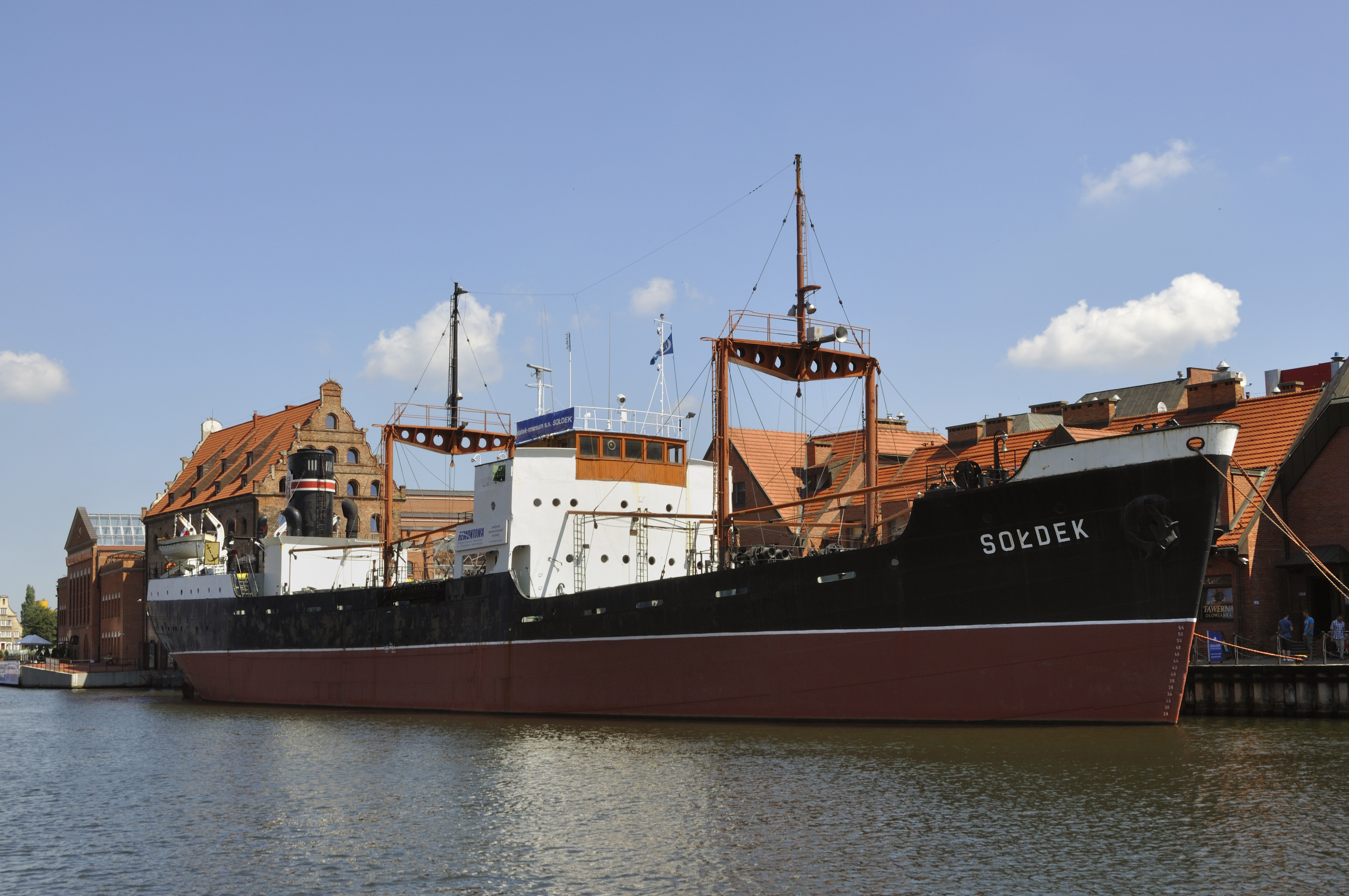
- Sołdek as a museum ship in Gdansk

History

Poland
- Name: Sołdek
- Namesake: Stanisław Sołdek
- Owner: Polish Government
- Operator: Polska Żegluga Morska
- Port of registry: Szczecin
- Builder: Zjednoczenie Stocznie Polskich, Gdańsk
- Laid down: 3 April 1948
- Launched: 6 November 1948
- In service: 21 October 1949
- Out of service: 30 December 1980
- Identification: IMO number: 5333373; call sign: SPCJ
- Status: Established as a museum ship in Gdansk, 17 July 1985

General characteristics
- Class & type: B30 cargo ship
- Tonnage: 2,005 GRT; 994 NRT; 2,610 t DWT
- Length: 285.4 ft (87 m) overall; 257.1 ft (78.4 m) registered
- Beam: 38.5 ft (11.7 m)
- Draught: 17 ft 8 in (5.38 m)
- Depth: 17.7 ft (5.4 m)
- Installed power: 2 × Howden-Johnson boilers; 1 × 1,300 shp (969 kW) 4-cylinder compound engine
- Propulsion: 1 × screw
- Speed: 9.9 knots (18.3 km/h; 11.4 mph)
- Crew: 28

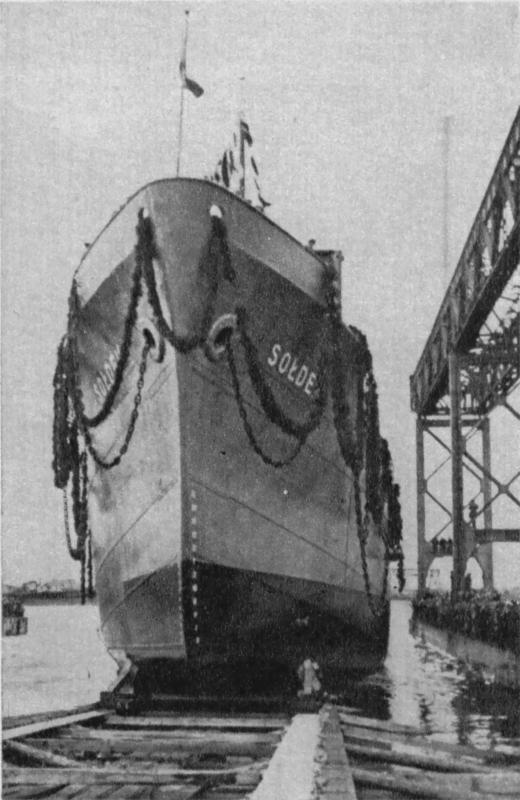
Launching of Sołdek

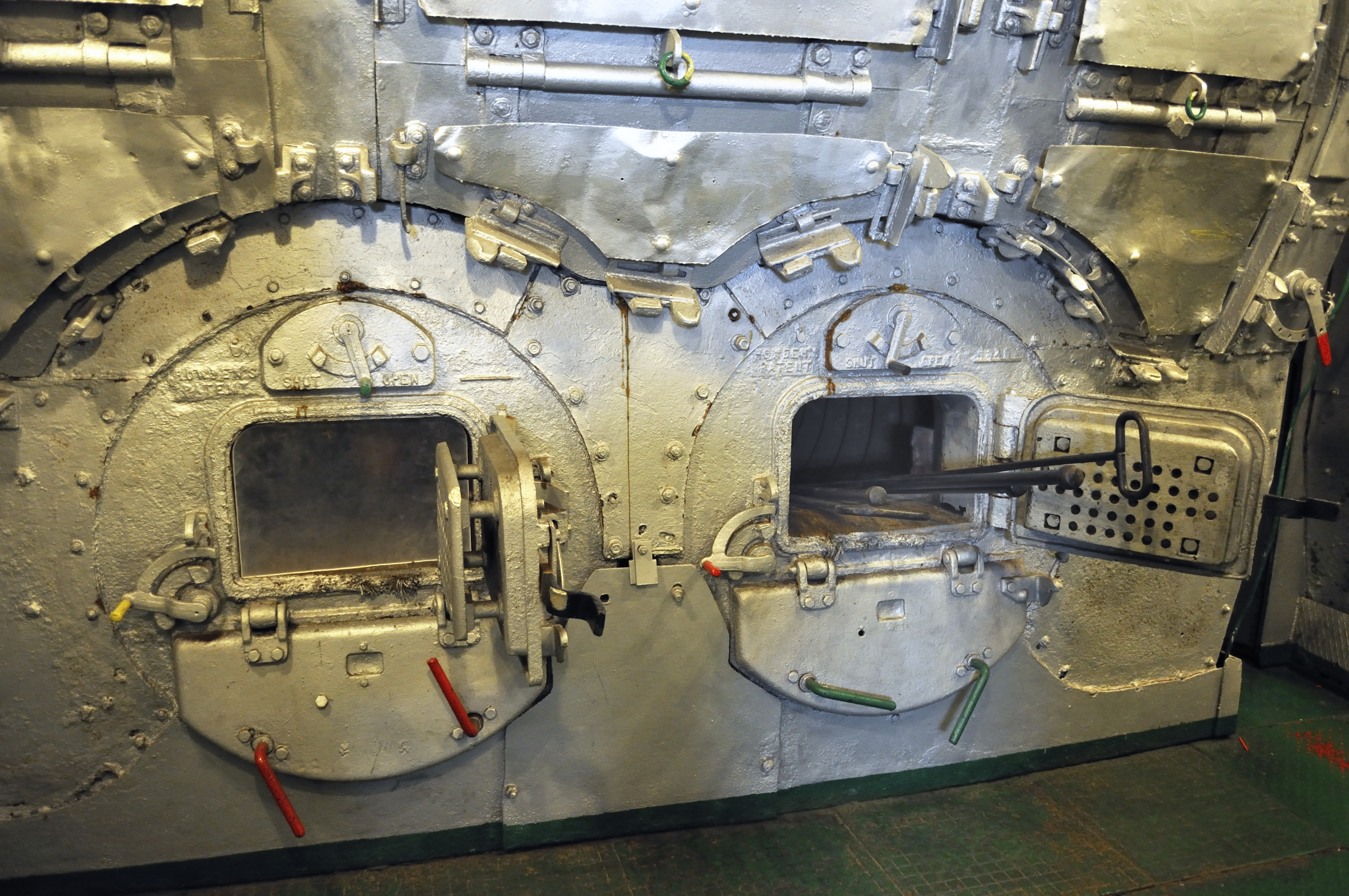
Furnaces of Sołdek's boilers

SS Sołdek is a retired Polish coal and ore cargo steamship. She was the first ship built in Gdańsk (Poland) after World War II, and the first seagoing ship completed in Poland. She was the first of 29 ships classed as Project B30, built between 1949 and 1954 in the Gdańsk Shipyard. The name was given in honour of Stanisław Sołdek, one of the shipyard's shock workers.

Sołdek is often confused with Oliwa, a former unfinished Hansa type A cargo ship, which was commissioned after Sołdek, however which's hull was already built in 1944. It was abandoned by the Germans on a slipway in Szczecin, and seized by Poland. Following this the hull was completed and the ship launched as Oliwa. Later she was renamed and entered service in 1951 as Marchlewski, serving the Polish Ocean Lines. Many sources incorrectly state that Oliwa was Sołdek's makeshift name during her launch, and that she was later relaunched again as Sołdek.

The ship is currently preserved as a museum ship in Gdańsk, as a part of National Maritime Museum collection.

The ship was used in the film Persona Non Grata as a Japanese steamer transporting Jews from Vladivostok to Tsuraga.

== Other B30 ships ==
=== Polish ===
- Sołdek (shipyard number B30/1)
- Jedność Robotnicza (B30/2)
- Brygada Makowskiego (B30/3)
- 1 Maj (B30/4) (sold to the USSR as Pervomaysk)
- Pstrowski (B30/5)
- Wieczorek (B30/6)

=== Built for the USSR ===
1. (B30/7) - Zaporozhe
2. (B30/8) - Krivoy Rog
3. (B30/9) - Kramatorsk
4. (B30/10) - Makeevka
5. (B30/11) - Gorlovka
6. (B30/12) - Novo-Shahtinsk
7. (B30/13) - Solikamsk
8. (B30/14) - Kurgan
9. (B30/15) - Zlatoust
10. (B30/16) - Minusinsk
11. (B30/17) - Pavlodar
12. (B30/18) - Jenakiyevo
13. (B30/19) - Nikitovka
14. (B30/20) - Novocherkassk
15. (B30/21) - Volnovacha
16. (B30/22) - Vitegra
17. (B30/23) - Tovda
18. (B30/24) - Kalar
19. (B30/25) - Azovstal
20. (B30/26) - Tkvarcheli
21. (B30/27) - Zangenzur
22. (B30/28) - Malaia Zemlia
23. (B30/29) - Pereyeslav Khmielnitsky

A number of B-30 ships saw service for the Soviet Navy, as auxiliary vessels (e. g. transports), including the "Tovda" and the "Vitegra". Corresponding data (including side plan) can be found i. a. in Weyer's Flottentaschenbuch 1971/72.

== Gallery ==
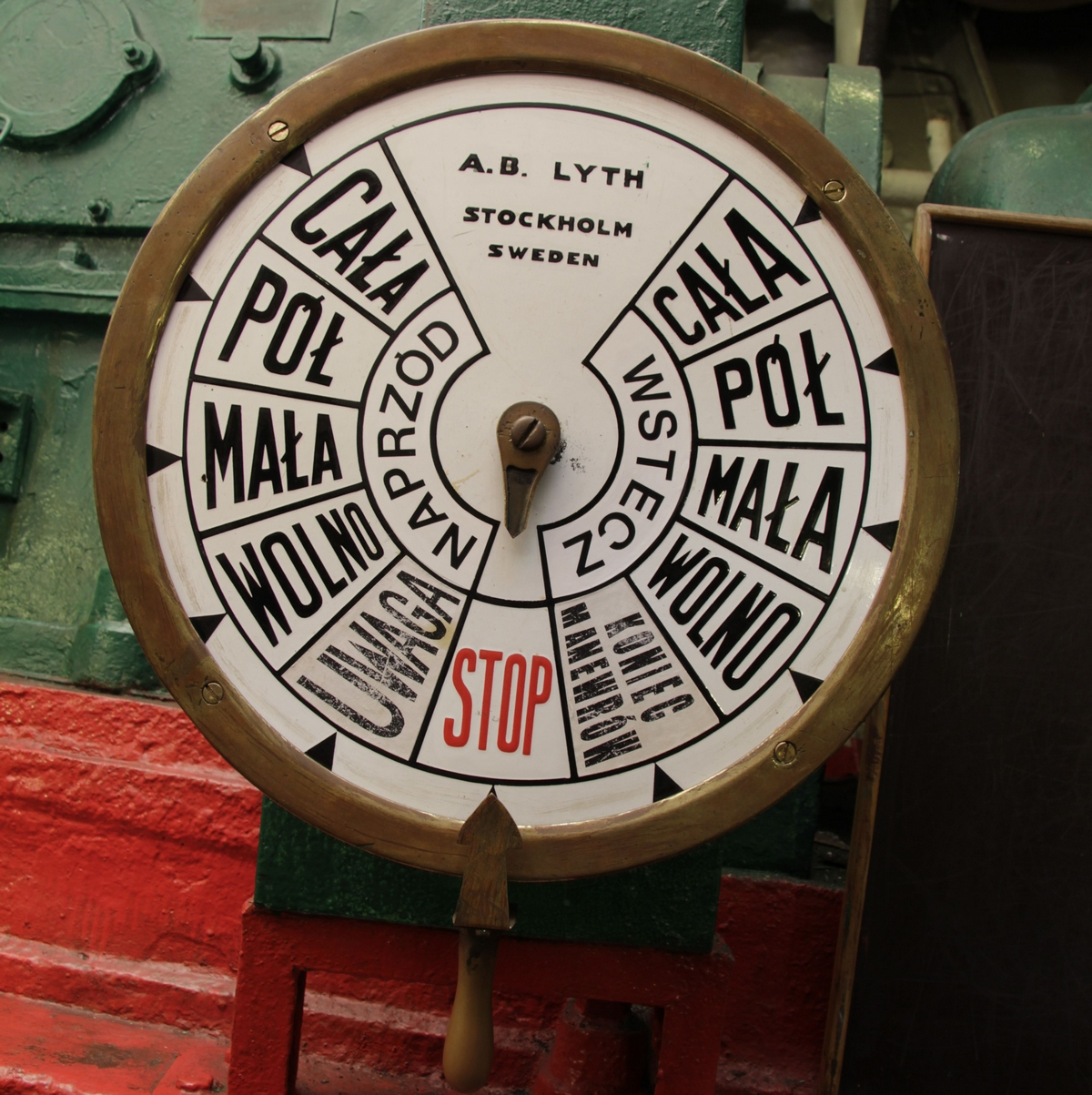
Chadburn in engine room of Sołdek

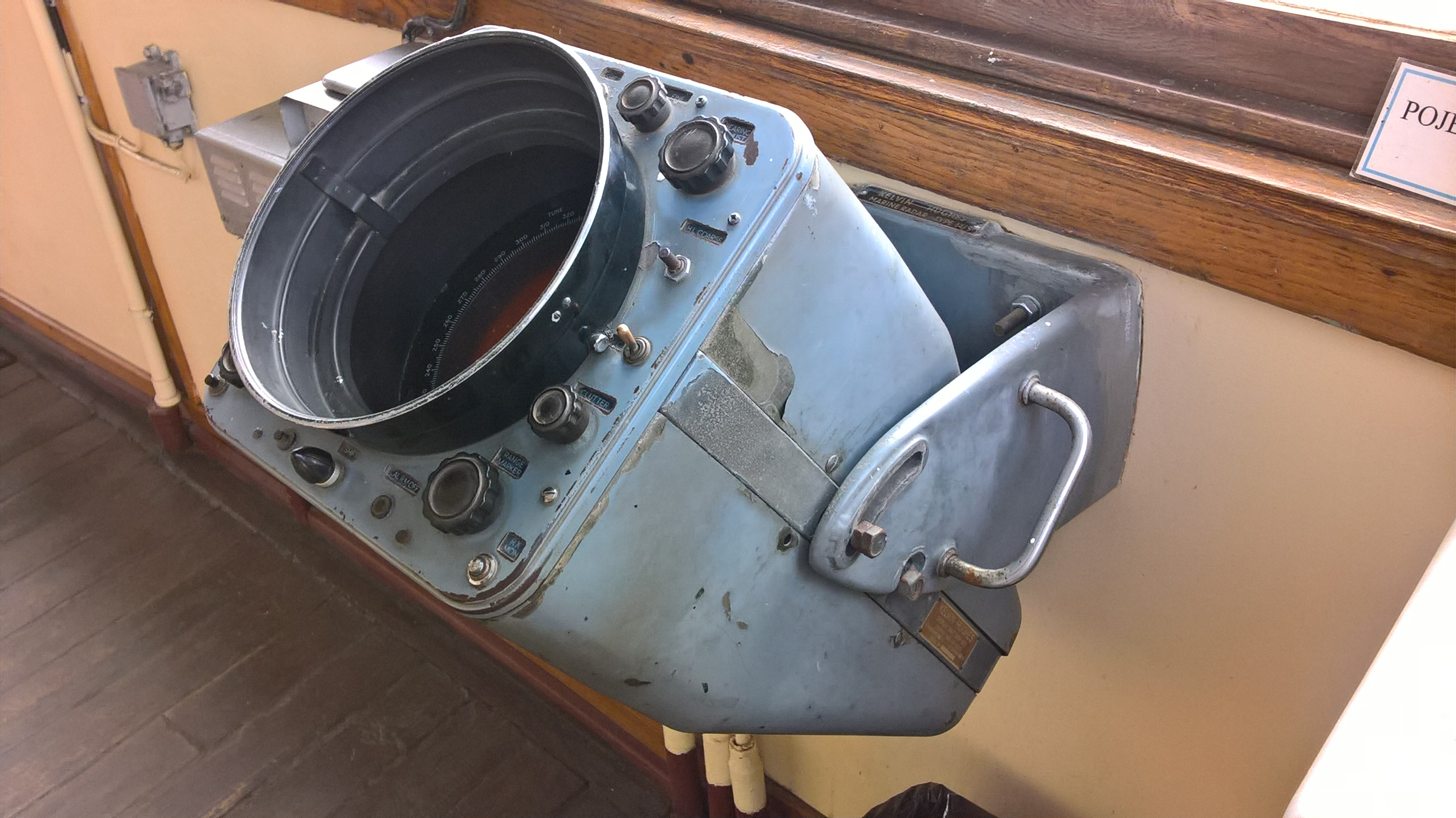
Radar of Sołdek (1)

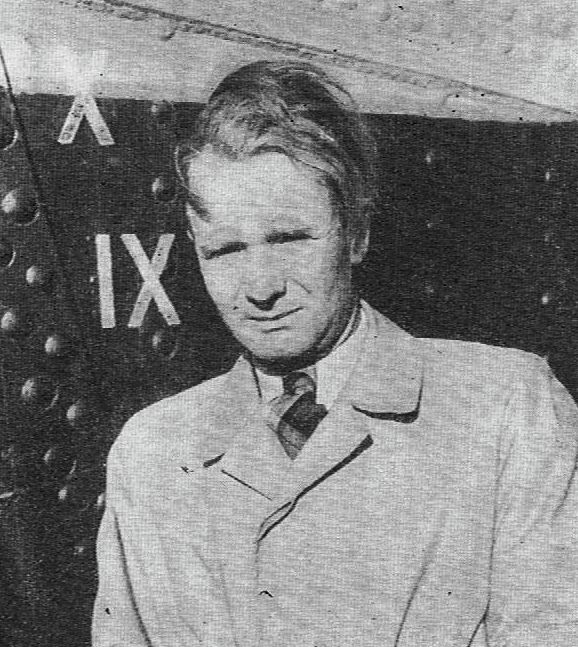
Stanisław Sołdek, the person the ship was named after

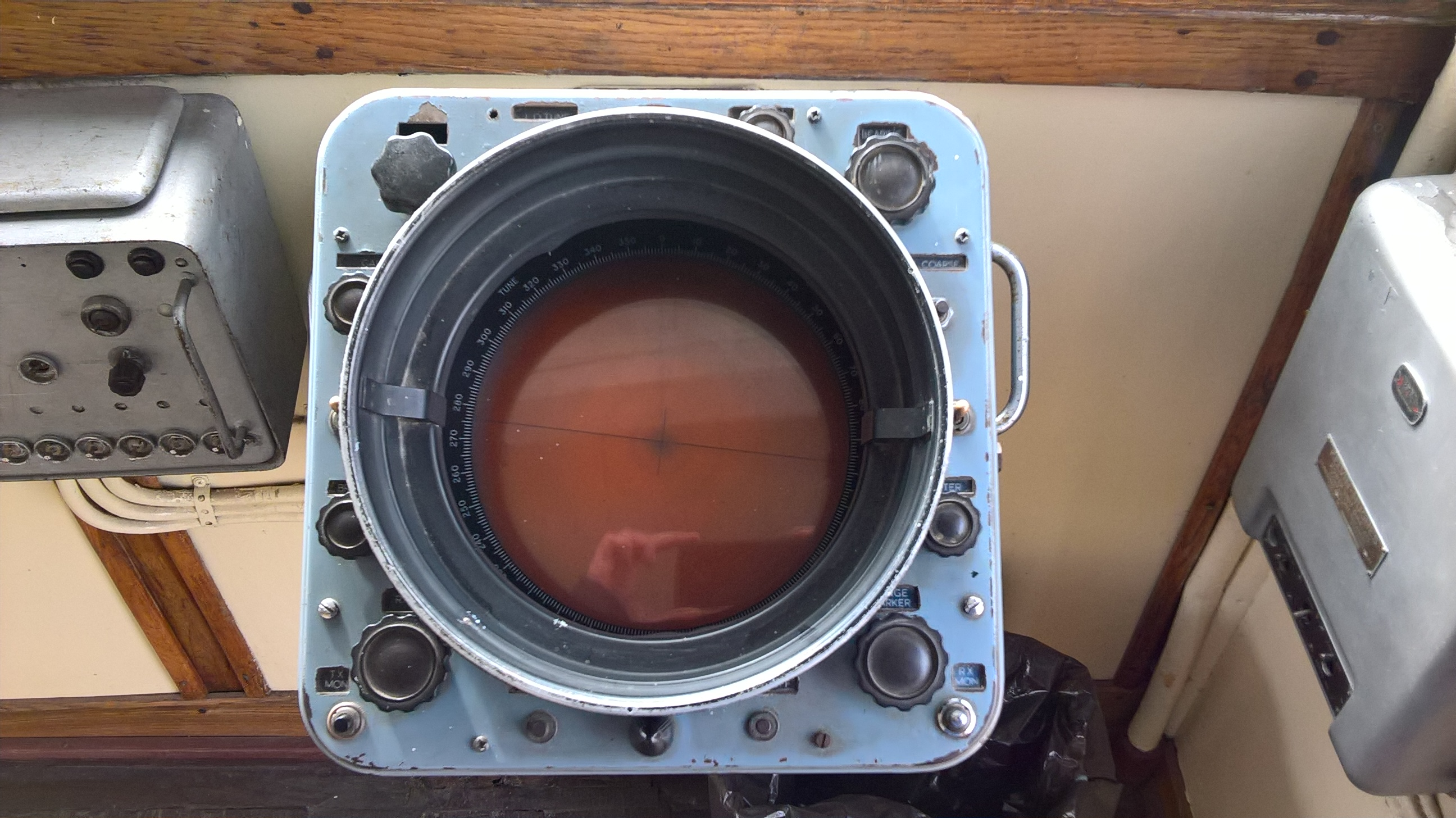
Radar of Sołdek (2)

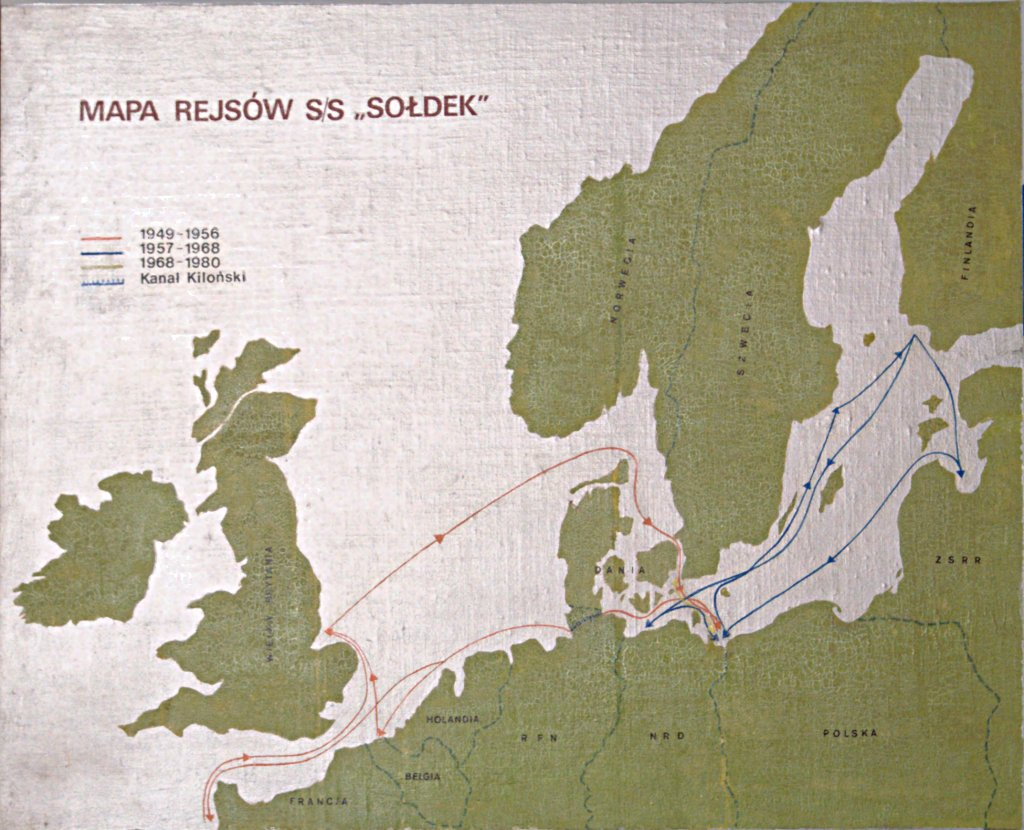
Polish map of Sołdek's voyages

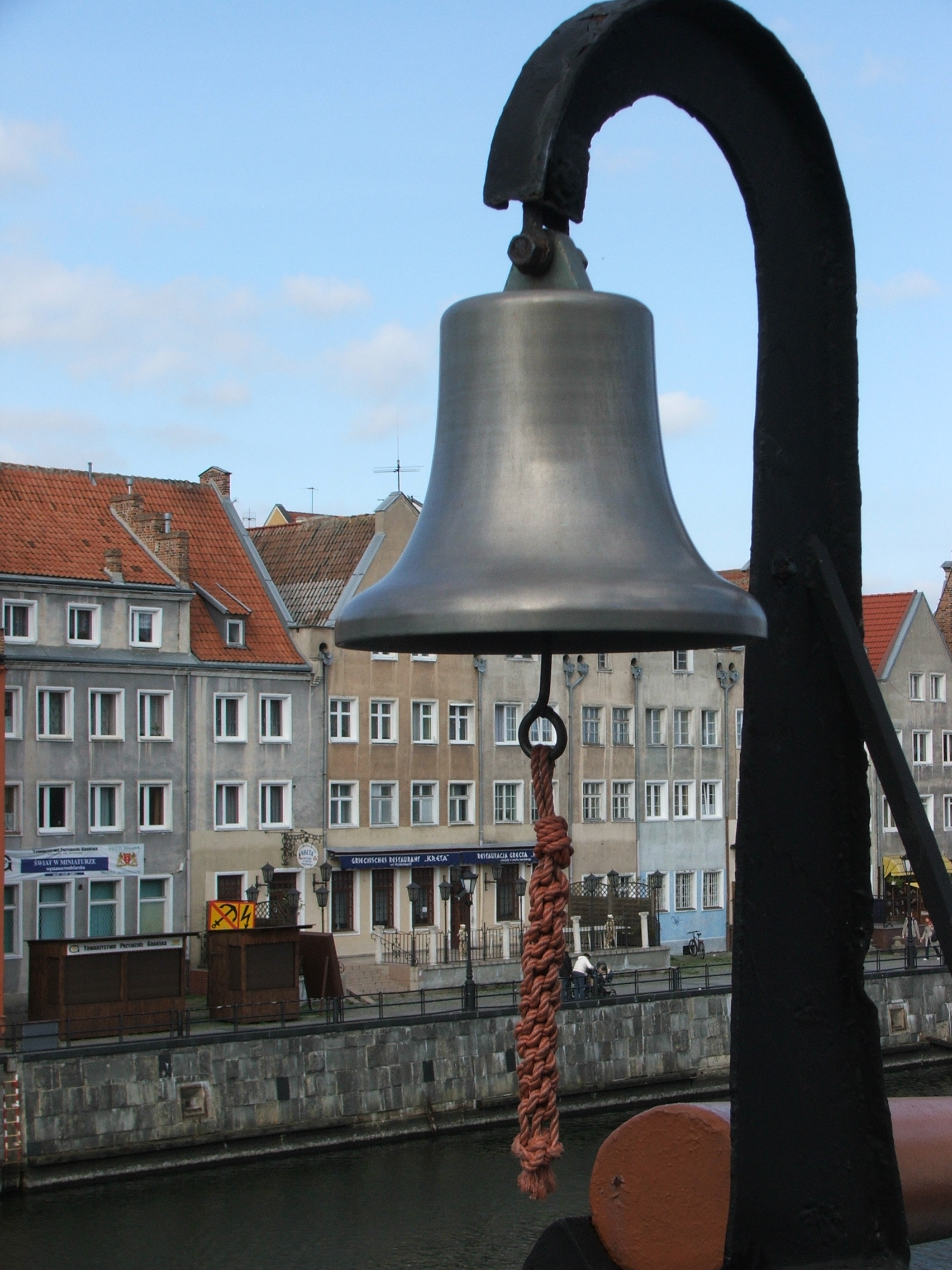
Sołdek's bell

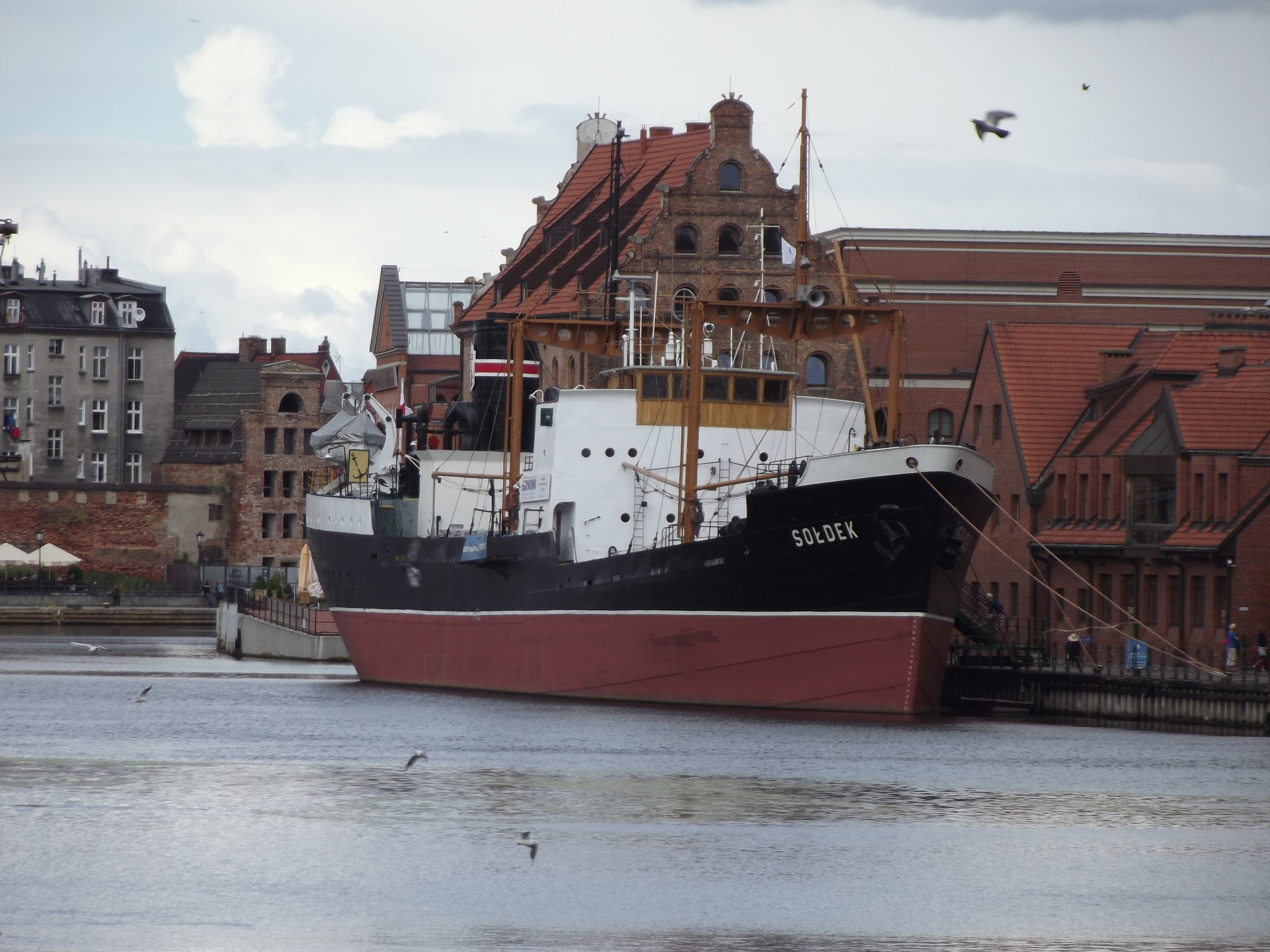
Front view at the ship

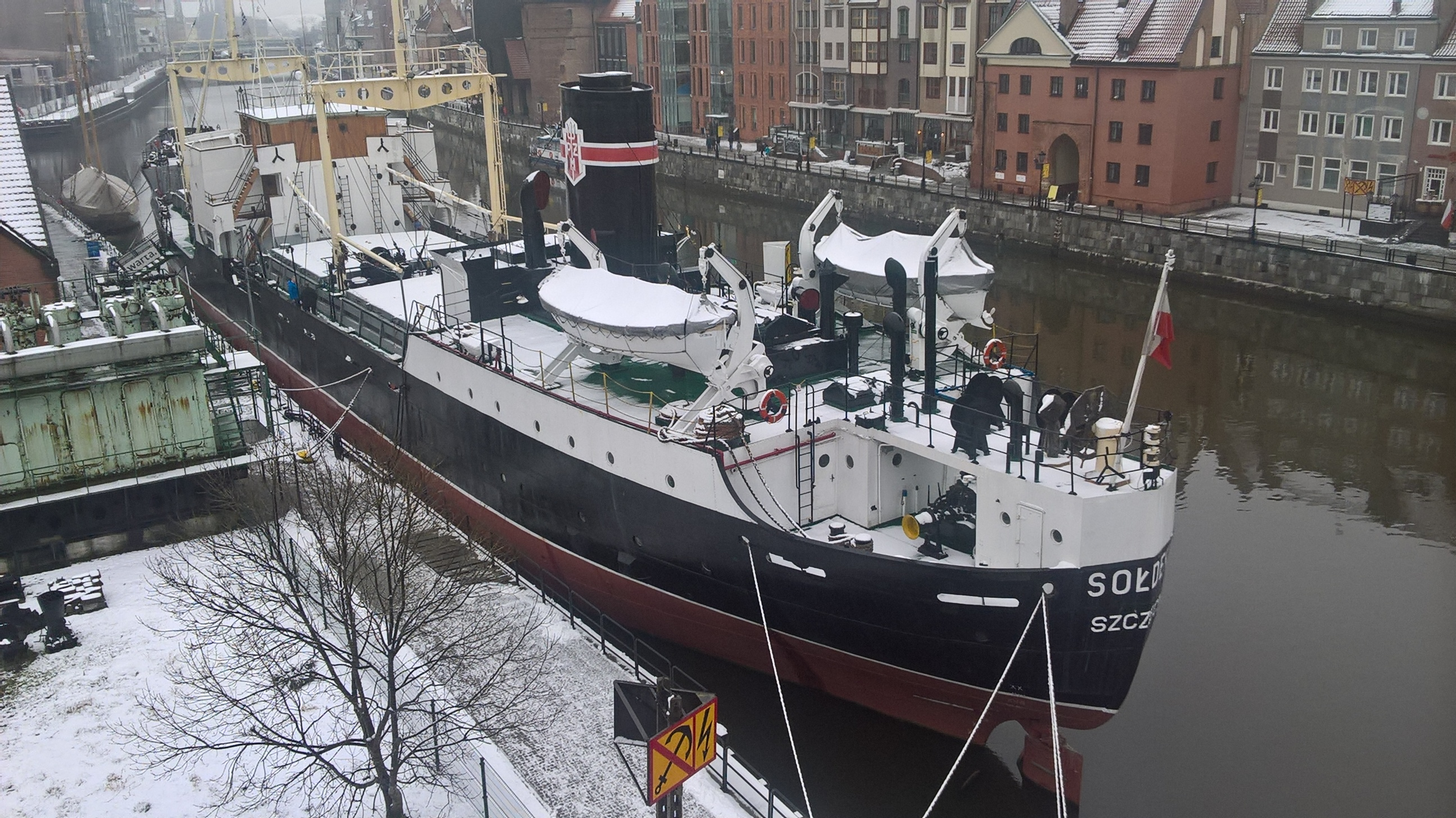
Back

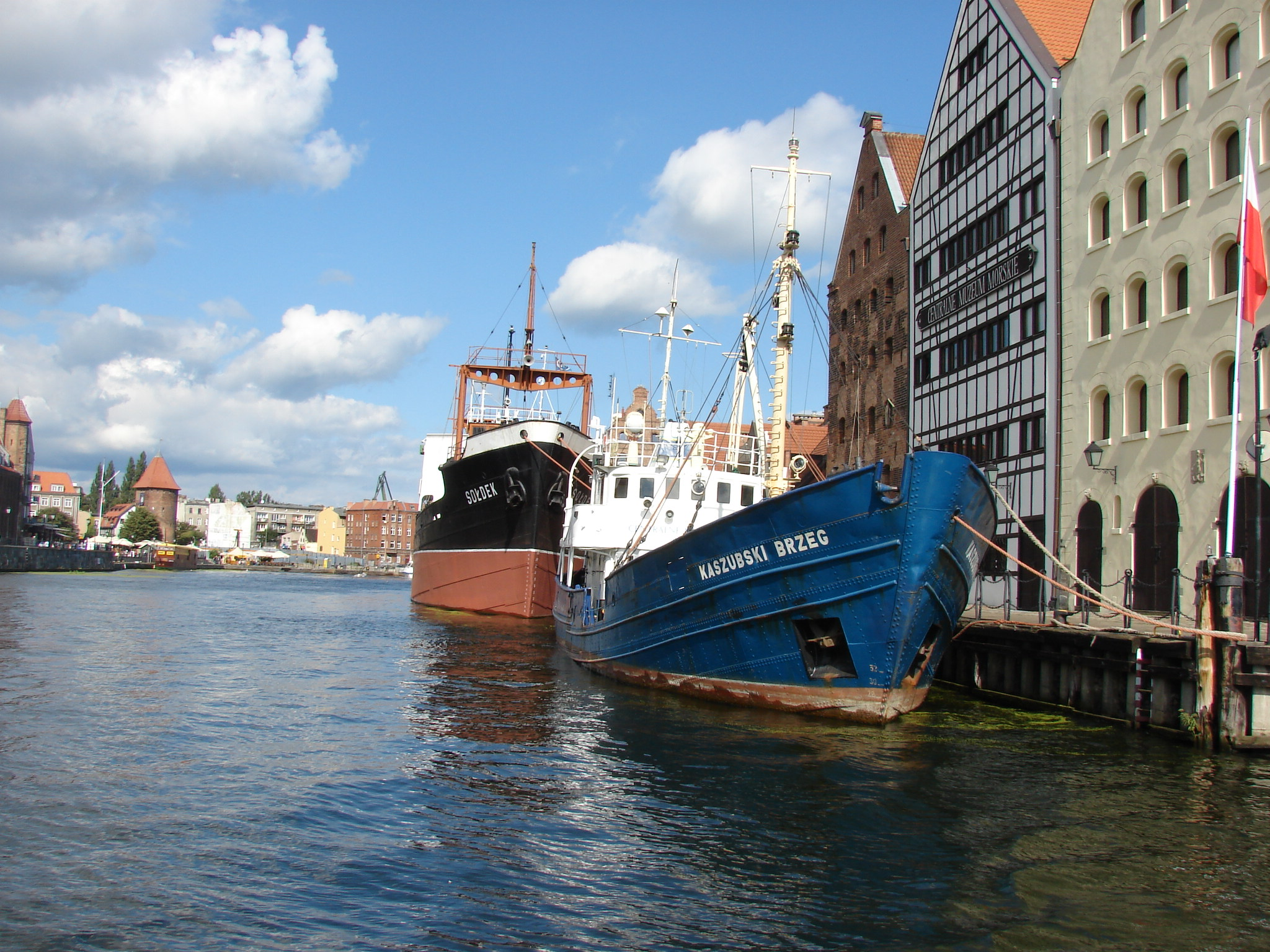
Sołdek and Kaszubski Brzeg

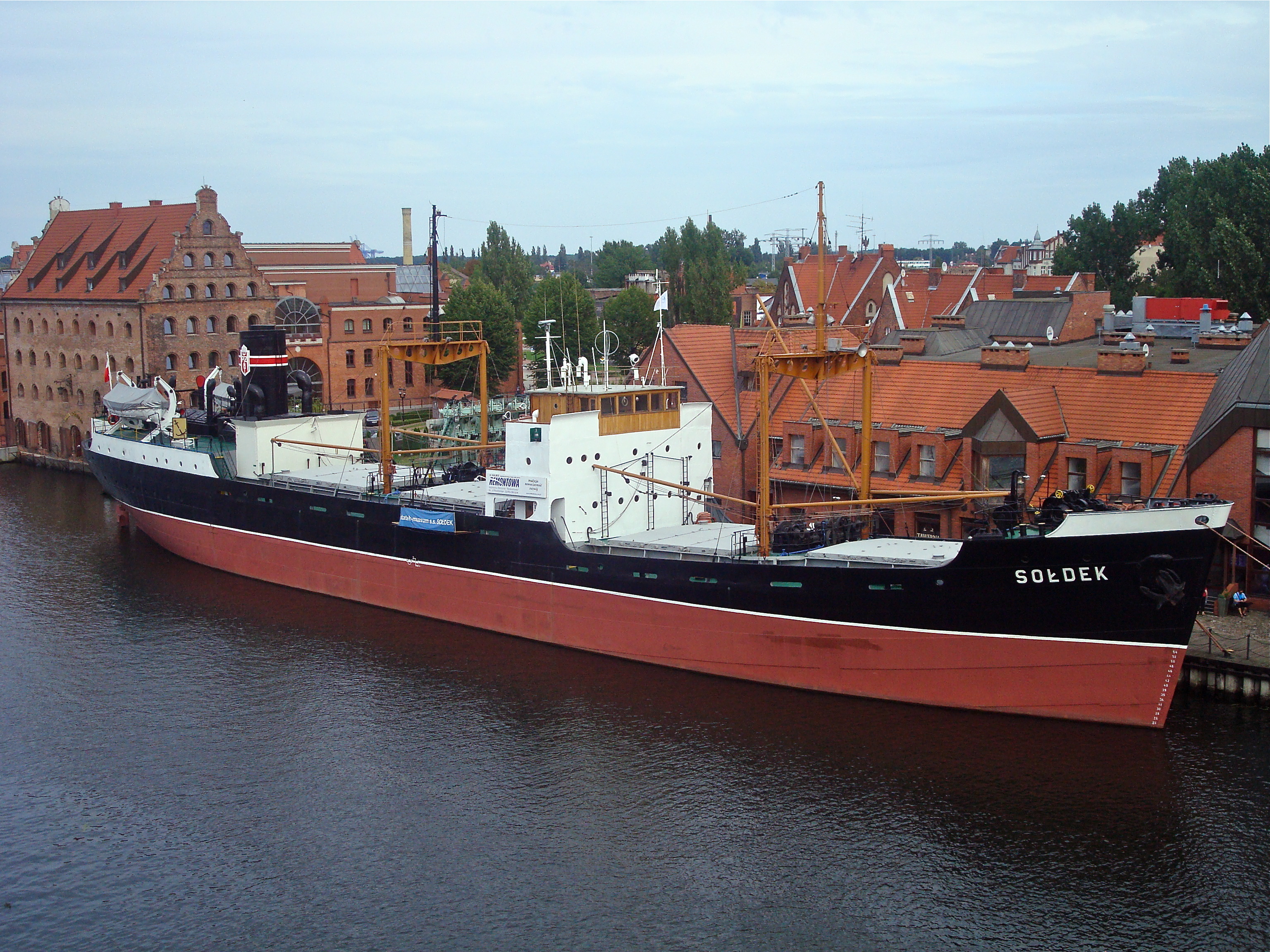
Another view at the vessel

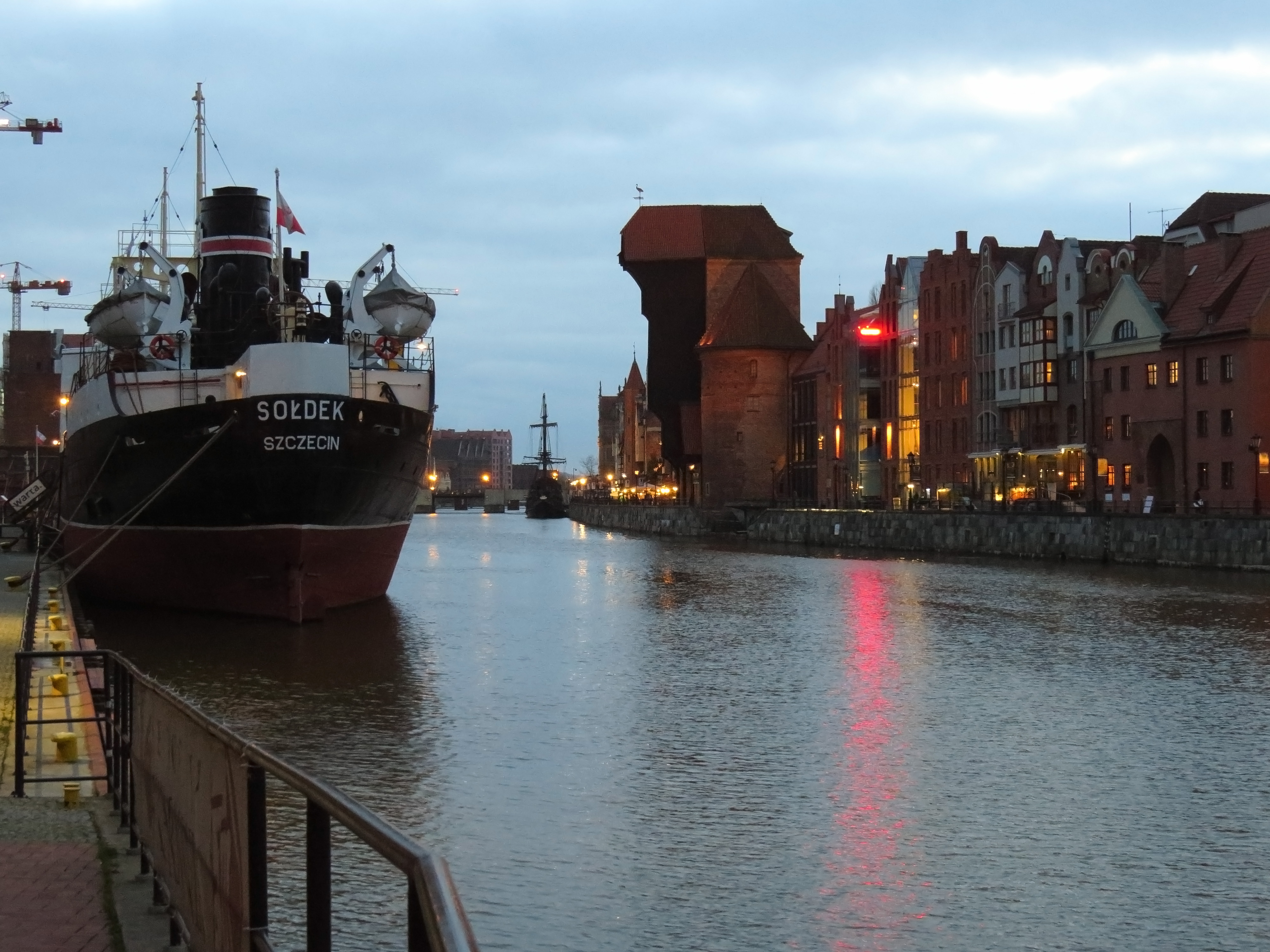
Sołdek on the Motława river
