= HMS Braithwaite =

Frigate of the Royal Navy

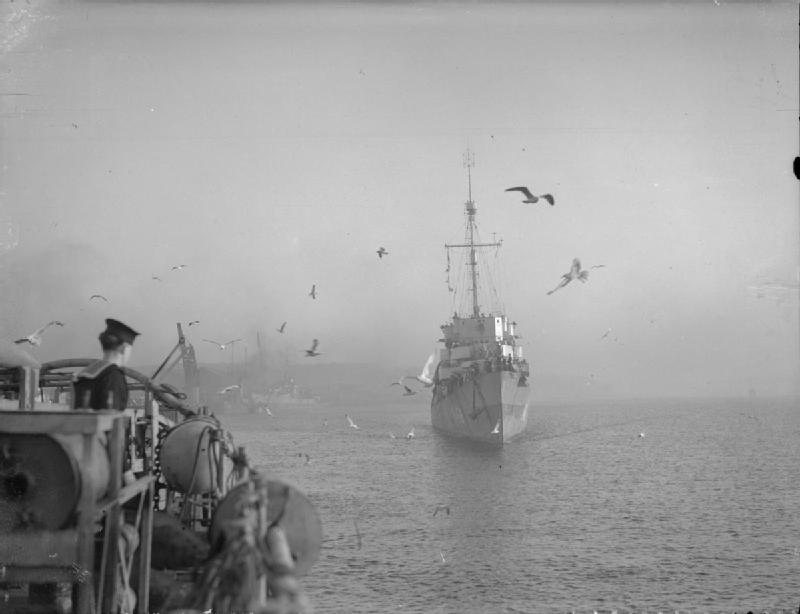
- HMS Braithwaite coming in to HMS Ferret.

History

United Kingdom
- Builder: Bethlehem-Hingham Shipyard Inc. (Hingham, Massachusetts)
- Laid down: 10 May 1943
- Launched: 31 July 1943
- Commissioned: 13 November 1943
- Decommissioned: Returned to US Navy on 17 December 1945
- Identification: Pennant number: K468 (UK); DE-77 (US)
- Fate: Sold June 1946

General characteristics
- Class & type: Captain-class frigate
- Displacement: 1,800 long tons (1,829 t) (fully loaded)
- Length: 306 ft (93 m) overall
- Beam: 36.5 ft (11.1 m)
- Draught: 11 ft (3.4 m) fully loaded
- Speed: 24 knots (44 km/h)
- Endurance: 5,500 nautical miles (10,190 km) at 15 knots (28 km/h)
- Complement: Typically between 170 & 180

HMS Braithwaite was a Captain-class frigate of the Royal Navy during World War II. She was named after Captain Samuel Braithwaite of HMS Kingston, who had an eventful career, taking part in numerous engagements during the 18th century.

Originally destined for the US Navy as a turbo-electric (TE) type Buckley-class destroyer escort, Braithwaite was provisionally given the name USS Straub (this name was reassigned to Straub (DE-181)) however the delivery was diverted to the Royal Navy before the launch.

== Actions ==
Braithwaite served with both the 3rd and 10th Escort Groups earning battle honours for service in the North Atlantic, English Channel, Normandy 1944, North Foreland and the North Sea.

On 3 February 1945 the German submarine U-327 was sunk in the North Sea north-west of Bergen, in approximate position 61°21′N 02°00′E, by depth charges from the frigates Braithwaite, Bayntun and Loch Eck. Forty-eight German sailors were killed, and there were no survivors.

On 14 February 1945 U-989 was sunk off the Faroe Islands, in position 61°36′N 01°35′W by depth charges from the frigates Braithwaite, Bayntun, Loch Eck and Loch Dunvegan. Again there were no survivors, and the entire crew of 47 were killed.

== Fate ==
She was declared "not essential to the defence of the United States" on 8 January 1946. The hull number was struck from the Navy list on 21 January 1946, and then sold to Northern Metals Co. of Philadelphia in June 1946 for scrapping.
