= German submarine U-327 =

German World War II submarine

History

Nazi Germany
- Name: U-327
- Ordered: 16 July 1942
- Builder: Flender Werke, Lübeck
- Yard number: 327
- Laid down: 15 April 1943
- Launched: 27 May 1944
- Commissioned: 18 July 1944
- Fate: Sunk on 3 February 1945

General characteristics
- Class & type: Type VIIC/41 submarine
- Displacement: 759 tonnes (747 long tons) surfaced; 860 t (846 long tons) submerged
- Length: 67.23 m (220 ft 7 in) o/a; 50.50 m (165 ft 8 in) pressure hull
- Beam: 6.20 m (20 ft 4 in) o/a; 4.70 m (15 ft 5 in) pressure hull
- Height: 9.60 m (31 ft 6 in)
- Draught: 4.74 m (15 ft 7 in)
- Installed power: 2,800–3,200 PS (2,100–2,400 kW; 2,800–3,200 bhp) (diesels); 750 PS (550 kW; 740 shp) (electric)
- Propulsion: 2 shafts; 2 × diesel engines; 2 × electric motors
- Speed: 17.7 knots (32.8 km/h; 20.4 mph) surfaced; 7.6 knots (14.1 km/h; 8.7 mph) submerged
- Range: 8,500 nmi (15,700 km; 9,800 mi) at 10 knots (19 km/h; 12 mph) surfaced; 80 nmi (150 km; 92 mi) at 4 knots (7.4 km/h; 4.6 mph) submerged
- Test depth: 250 m (820 ft); Crush depth: 275–325 m (902–1,066 ft)
- Complement: 4 officers, 40–56 enlisted
- Armament: 5 × 53.3 cm (21 in) torpedo tubes (four bow, one stern); 14 × torpedoes; 1 × 8.8 cm (3.46 in) deck gun (220 rounds); 1 × 3.7 cm (1.5 in) Flak M42 AA gun; 2 × 2 cm (0.79 in) C/30 AA guns

Service record
- Part of: 4th U-boat Flotilla; 18 July 1944 – 31 January 1945; 11th U-boat Flotilla; 1 – 3 February 1945
- Identification codes: M 36 449
- Commanders: Kptlt. Hans Lemcke; 18 July 1944 – 3 February 1945
- Operations: 3 patrols: 1st patrol: 20 – 24 January 1945; 2nd patrol: 28 – 29 January 1945; 3rd patrol: 30 January – 3 February 1945
- Victories: None

German submarine U-327 was a Type VIIC/41 U-boat of Nazi Germany's Kriegsmarine during World War II.

She carried out three patrols, but did not sink any ships.

The boat was sunk on 3 February 1945 by British warships in the Norwegian Sea north-west of Bergen.

== Design ==
German Type VIIC/41 submarines were preceded by the heavier Type VIIC submarines. U-327 had a displacement of 759 tonnes (747 long tons) when at the surface and 860 tonnes (850 long tons) while submerged. She had a total length of 67.10 m (220 ft 2 in), a pressure hull length of 50.50 m (165 ft 8 in), a beam of 6.20 m (20 ft 4 in), a height of 9.60 m (31 ft 6 in), and a draught of 4.74 m (15 ft 7 in). The submarine was powered by two Germaniawerft F46 four-stroke, six-cylinder supercharged diesel engines producing a total of 2,800 to 3,200 metric horsepower (2,060 to 2,350 kW; 2,760 to 3,160 shp) for use while surfaced, two Garbe, Lahmeyer & Co. RP 137/c double-acting electric motors producing a total of 750 metric horsepower (550 kW; 740 shp) for use while submerged. She had two shafts and two 1.23 m (4 ft) propellers. The boat was capable of operating at depths of up to 230 metres (750 ft).

The submarine had a maximum surface speed of 17.7 knots (32.8 km/h; 20.4 mph) and a maximum submerged speed of 7.6 knots (14.1 km/h; 8.7 mph). When submerged, the boat could operate for 80 nautical miles (150 km; 92 mi) at 4 knots (7.4 km/h; 4.6 mph); when surfaced, she could travel 8,500 nautical miles (15,700 km; 9,800 mi) at 10 knots (19 km/h; 12 mph). U-327 was fitted with five 53.3 cm (21 in) torpedo tubes (four fitted at the bow and one at the stern), fourteen torpedoes, one 8.8 cm (3.46 in) SK C/35 naval gun, (220 rounds), one 3.7 cm (1.5 in) Flak M42 and two 2 cm (0.79 in) C/30 anti-aircraft guns. The boat had a complement of between forty-four and sixty.

== Service history ==
The submarine was laid down on 15 April 1943 by the Flender Werke yard at Lübeck as yard number 327, launched on 27 May 1944 and commissioned on 18 July under the command of Kapitänleutnant Hans Lemcke.

She served with the 4th U-boat Flotilla for training, from 18 July 1944 to 31 January 1945 and the 11th flotilla for operations until her sinking on 3 February.

=== First patrol ===
U-327 departed Kiel on 20 January 1945 and arrived in Horten Naval Base in Norway (south of Oslo), on the 24th.

=== Second patrol ===
The boat left Horten on 28 January 1945. She arrived at Kristiansand the next day.

=== Third patrol and loss ===
U-327 commenced her third patrol on 30 January 1945. On 3 February she was sunk by depth charges dropped by the British frigates HMS Bayntun, HMS Braithwaite and HMS Loch Eck.

Forty-six men died; there were no survivors.

=== Previously recorded fate ===
The boat was reported missing after 31 January 1945 southwest of the British coast.

== See also ==
- Battle of the Atlantic (1939-1945)

== Bibliography ==
- Busch, Rainer; Röll, Hans-Joachim (1999). German U-boat commanders of World War II : a biographical dictionary. Translated by Brooks, Geoffrey. London, Annapolis, Md: Greenhill Books, Naval Institute Press. ISBN 1-55750-186-6.
- Busch, Rainer; Röll, Hans-Joachim (1999). Der U-Boot-Krieg, 1939-1945: Deutsche U-Boot-Verluste von September 1939 bis Mai 1945 [German U-boat losses from September 1939 to May 1945] (in German). Vol. IV. Hamburg, Berlin, Bonn: Mittler. ISBN 3-8132-0514-2.
- Gröner, Erich; Jung, Dieter; Maass, Martin (1991). U-boats and Mine Warfare Vessels. German Warships 1815–1945. Vol. 2. Translated by Thomas, Keith; Magowan, Rachel. London: Conway Maritime Press. ISBN 0-85177-593-4.
- Kemp, Paul (1999). U-Boats Destroyed - German Submarine Losses in the World Wars. London: Arms & Armour. ISBN 1-85409-515-3.
