= Polsteam =

Shipping company of Poland

Polska Żegluga Morska
- House flag
- Trade name: Polsteam
- Company type: state-owned enterprise
- Industry: Shipping
- Founded: 2 January 1951; 75 years ago
- Headquarters: Szczecin, Poland
- Area served: Global
- Key people: Paweł Brzezicki (CEO)
- Subsidiaries: Unity Line
- Website: polsteam.com.pl

Polska Żegluga Morska known as Polsteam or PŻM, is a cargo ship operator based in Szczecin, Poland. Polsteam is a state-owned enterprise with around 3,000 employees.

A Chinese-built ship owned by the company, MS Polesie, caused the crash into and sinking of British-flagged MS Verity on 24 October 2023 in the North Sea.

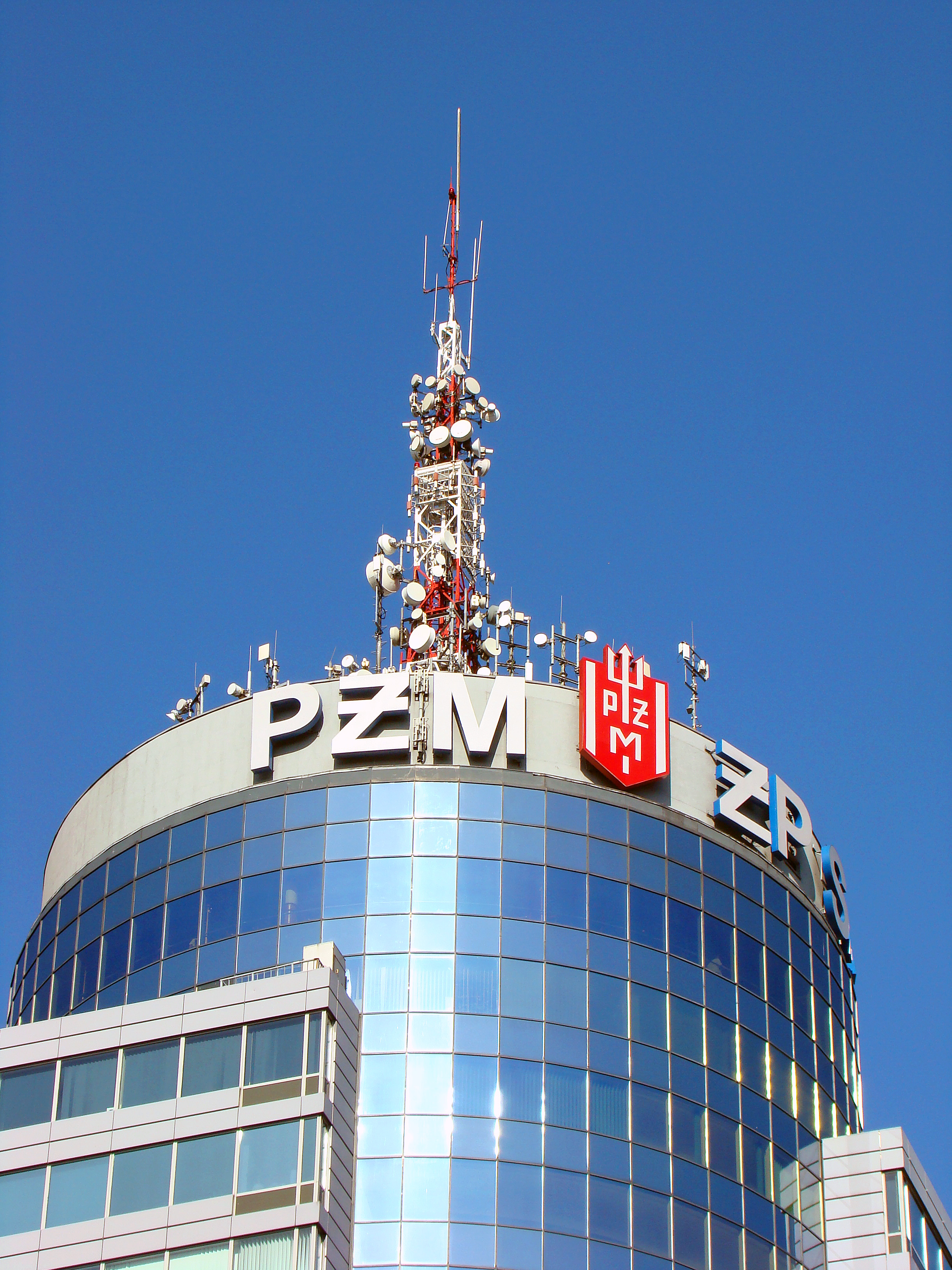
Polsteam headquarters (Pazim) in Szczecin

== Company history ==
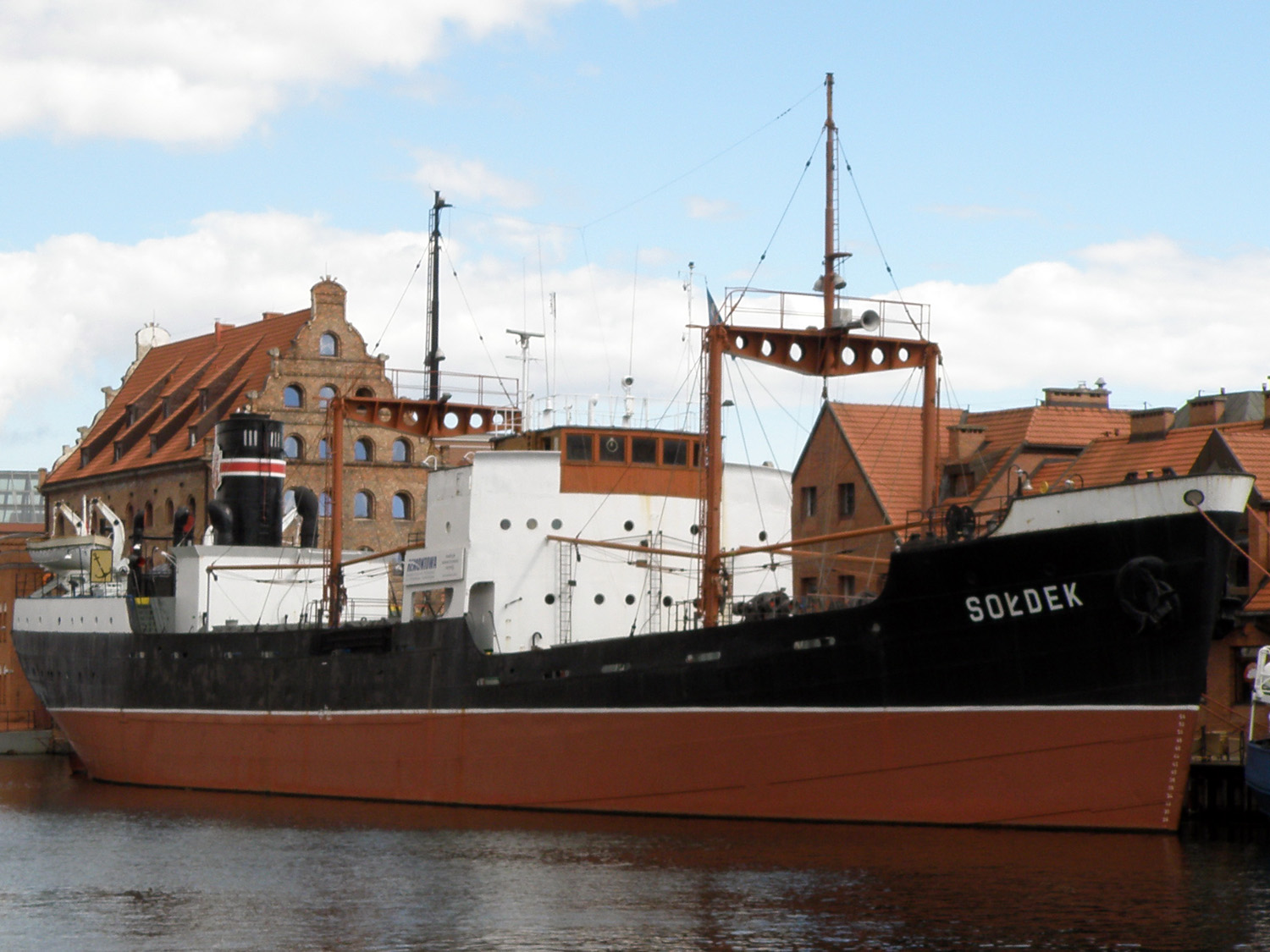
SS Sołdek

Polsteam was founded in 1951, nationalizing the assets of two Polish pre-WWII marine freight companies (Gdynia America Line and Żegluga Polska), making it the oldest Polish cargo ship operator in existence. Initially, Polsteam's fleet comprised 11 ships of joint carrying capacity of approx 27,000 DWT. Among those ships there were: four of the so-called. French ships, which were steamers built in 1926 in French shipyard of Chantiers Navals Français, in Blainville: SS Wieluń, SS Kraków, SS Toruń, SS Poznań, the oldest of the acquired ships was SS Narocz (2,520 DWT) built in 1915 in Great Britain, SS Narew (310 DWT) a small coaster built in 1944 in Germany and SS Elbląg (1,699 DWT) built in 1944. Four ships of B-30 series, constructed in 1949 in Gdańsk Shipyard: SS Sołdek (first ship in the post-WWII history of the Polish shipbuilding industry), SS Jedność Robotnicza, SS Pstrowski and SS Brygada Makowskiego (built in 1950).

In early years of Polsteam's existence, the ship owner's vessels navigated on short and midrange sea routes (i.e. the Baltic Sea, North Sea and Mediterranean Sea). During the course of the first five years, they carried coal, wood, and iron ore. 80-90% of shipping involved tramping services and although the ship operator had three lines since 1951 namely: Szczecin - Stockholm, Szczecin - London - Rouen and Szczecin - Hamburg - Rotterdam - Antwerp.

=== Fleet ===
It operates a fleet of 75 vessels (total: 2,500,000 DWT), mostly dry bulk carriers. Polsteam's particular specialty is the transportation of liquid sulfur.

Polsteam also operates a passenger ferry service between Świnoujście and the Swedish ports of Ystad and Trelleborg via its subsidiary Unity Line.

The PZM line operates a bi-weekly service from the IJmuiden docks in Amsterdam to the North American port of Duluth, Minnesota. Five 35,600-tonners were built in Japan by Mitsui over the years 1999-2000, and eight 30,000-tonners were built in China by Nanting Mingde over the years 2010-12. The older "Ziemia" class vessels were withdrawn from the Great Lakes trade before 2013. The dimensions are limited by the locks of the Saint Lawrence Seaway and the 40 ft draught of the Great Lakes Waterway. The Great Lakes Fleet comprise:

Polsteam's Great Lakes Fleet
image	name	year built	deadweight tonnage	length	breadth
	Irma	2000	35.600	200 metres (660 ft)	24 metres (79 ft)
	Iryda	1999	35.600	200 metres (660 ft)	24 metres (79 ft)
	Isa	1999	35.600	200 metres (660 ft)	24 metres (79 ft)
	Isadora	1999	35.600	200 metres (660 ft)	24 metres (79 ft)
	Isolda	1999	35.600	200 metres (660 ft)	24 metres (79 ft)
	Drawsko	2010	30.000	190 metres (620 ft)	23 metres (75 ft)
	Juno	2010	30.000	190 metres (620 ft)	23 metres (75 ft)
	Lubie	2011	30.000	190 metres (620 ft)	23 metres (75 ft)
	Mamry	2012	30.000	190 metres (620 ft)	23 metres (75 ft)
	Miedwe	2010	30.000	190 metres (620 ft)	23 metres (75 ft)
	Resko	2010	30.000	190 metres (620 ft)	23 metres (75 ft)
	Solina	2011	30.000	190 metres (620 ft)	23 metres (75 ft)
	Wicko	2010	30.000	190 metres (620 ft)	23 metres (75 ft)

== Polsteam Ships ==
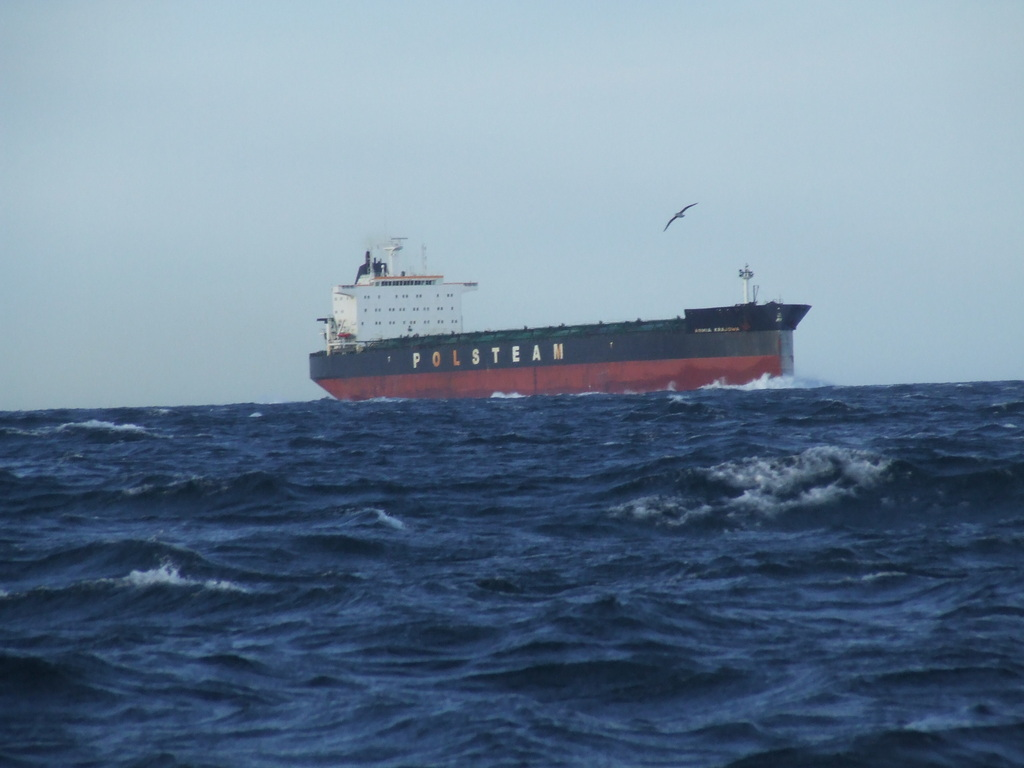
MS Armia Krajowa

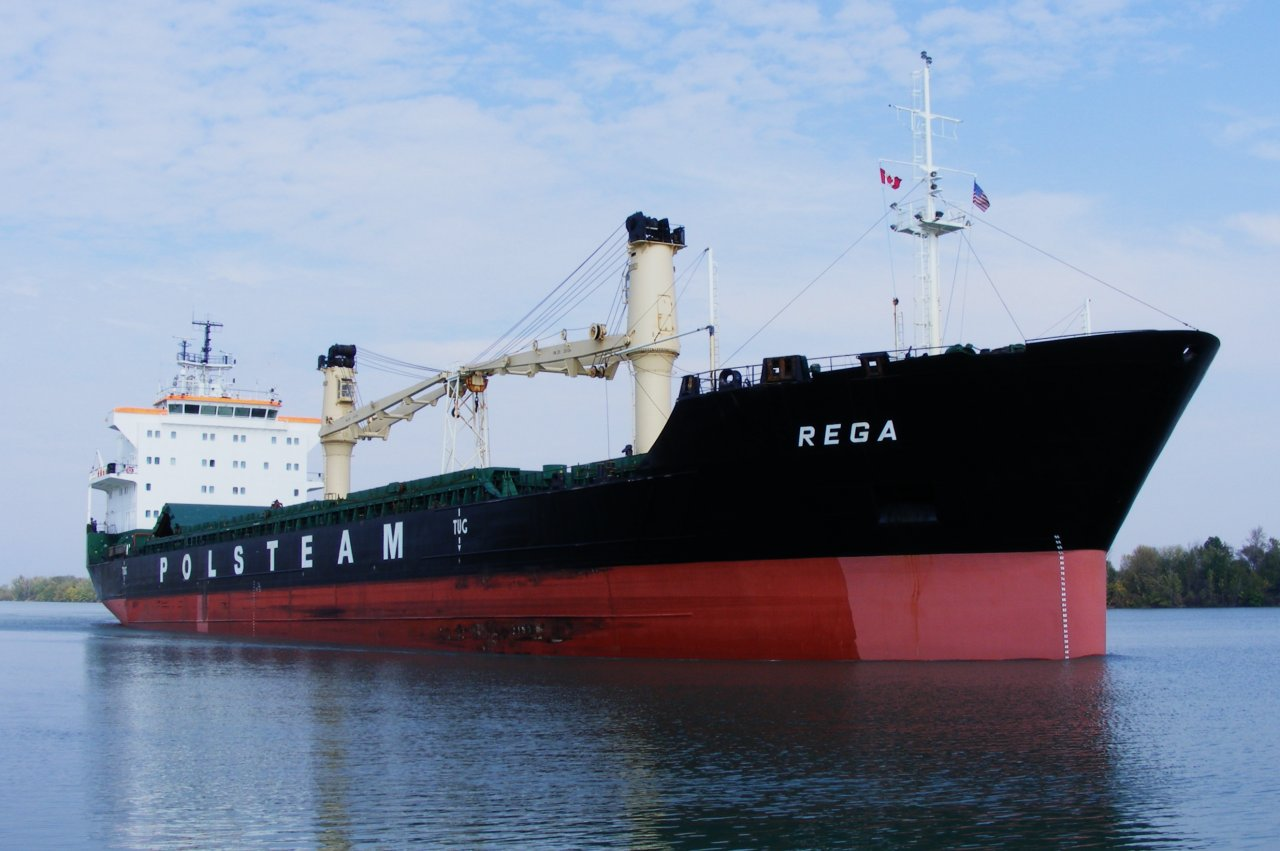
MS Rega

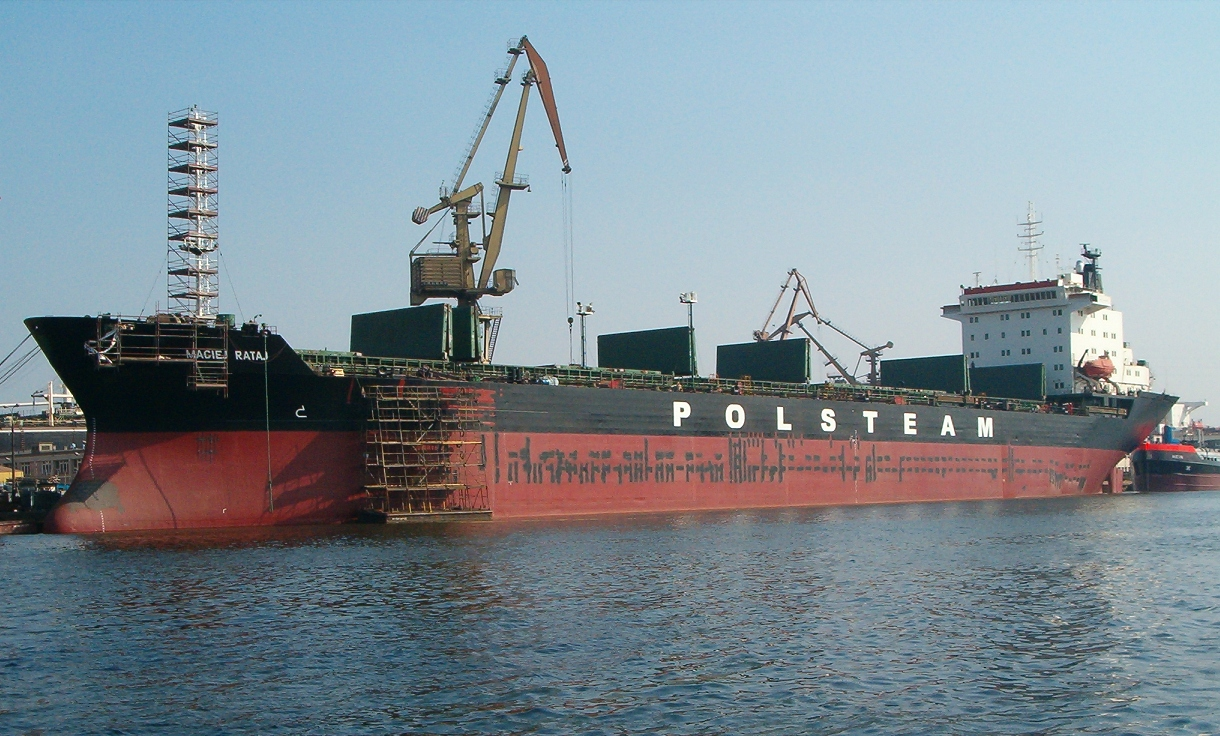
MS Maciej Rataj

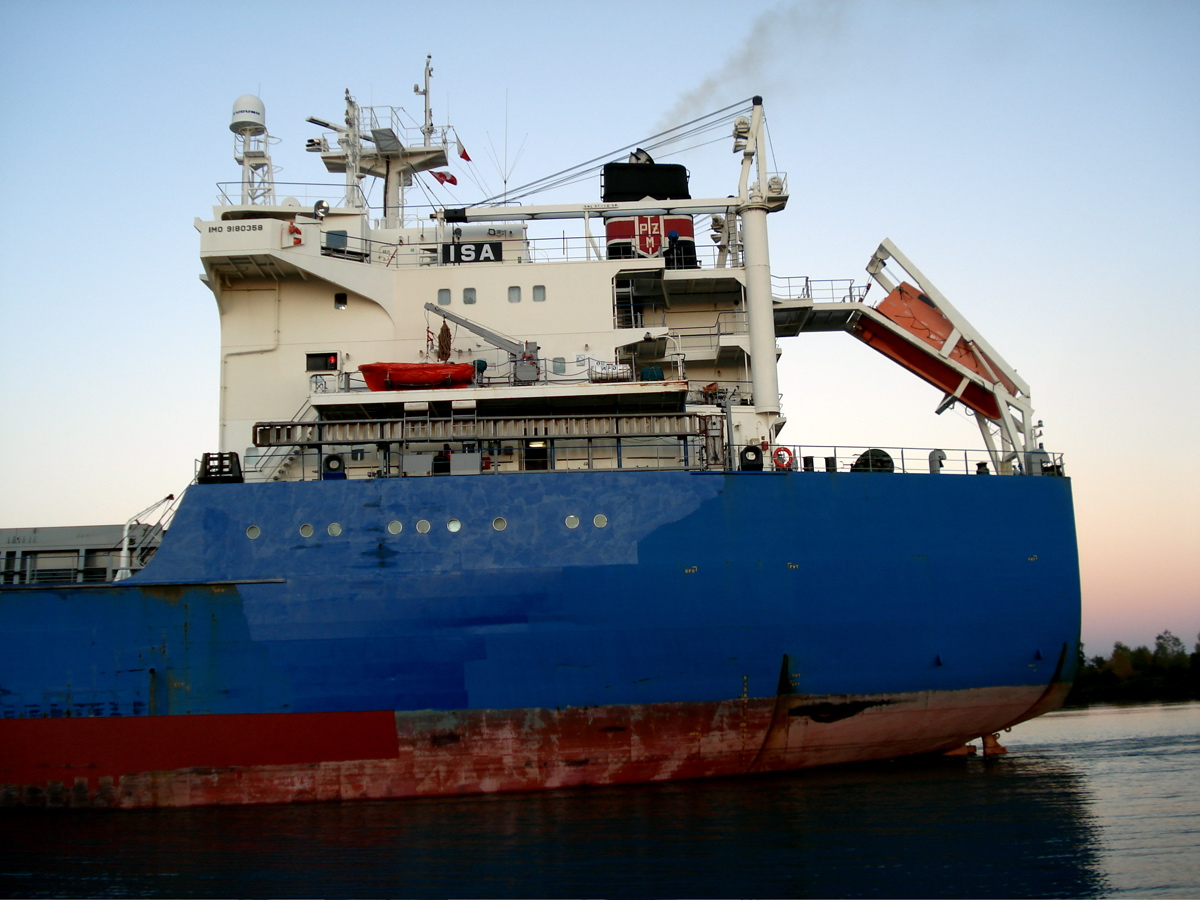
MS Isa

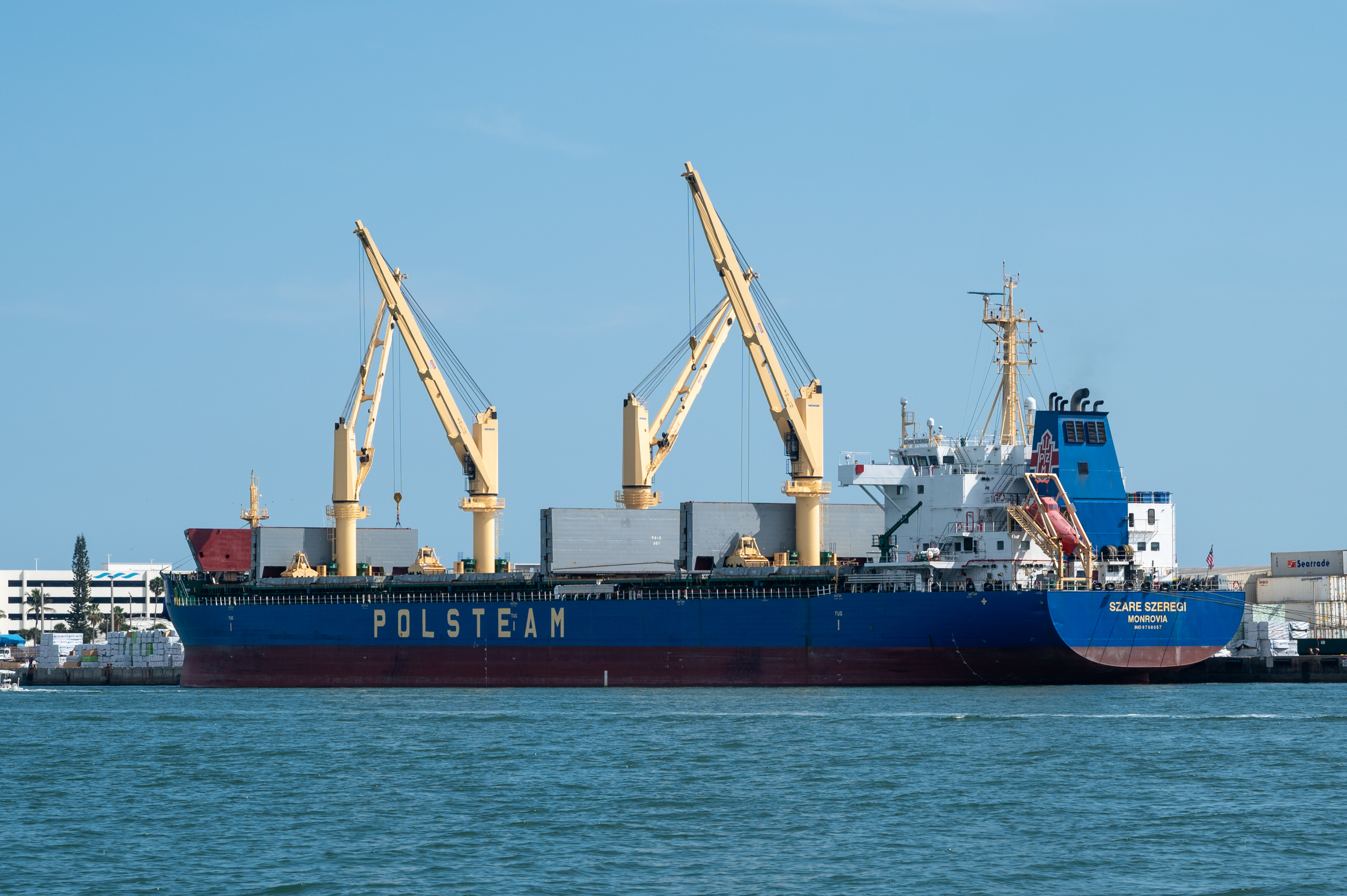
MS Szare Szeregi

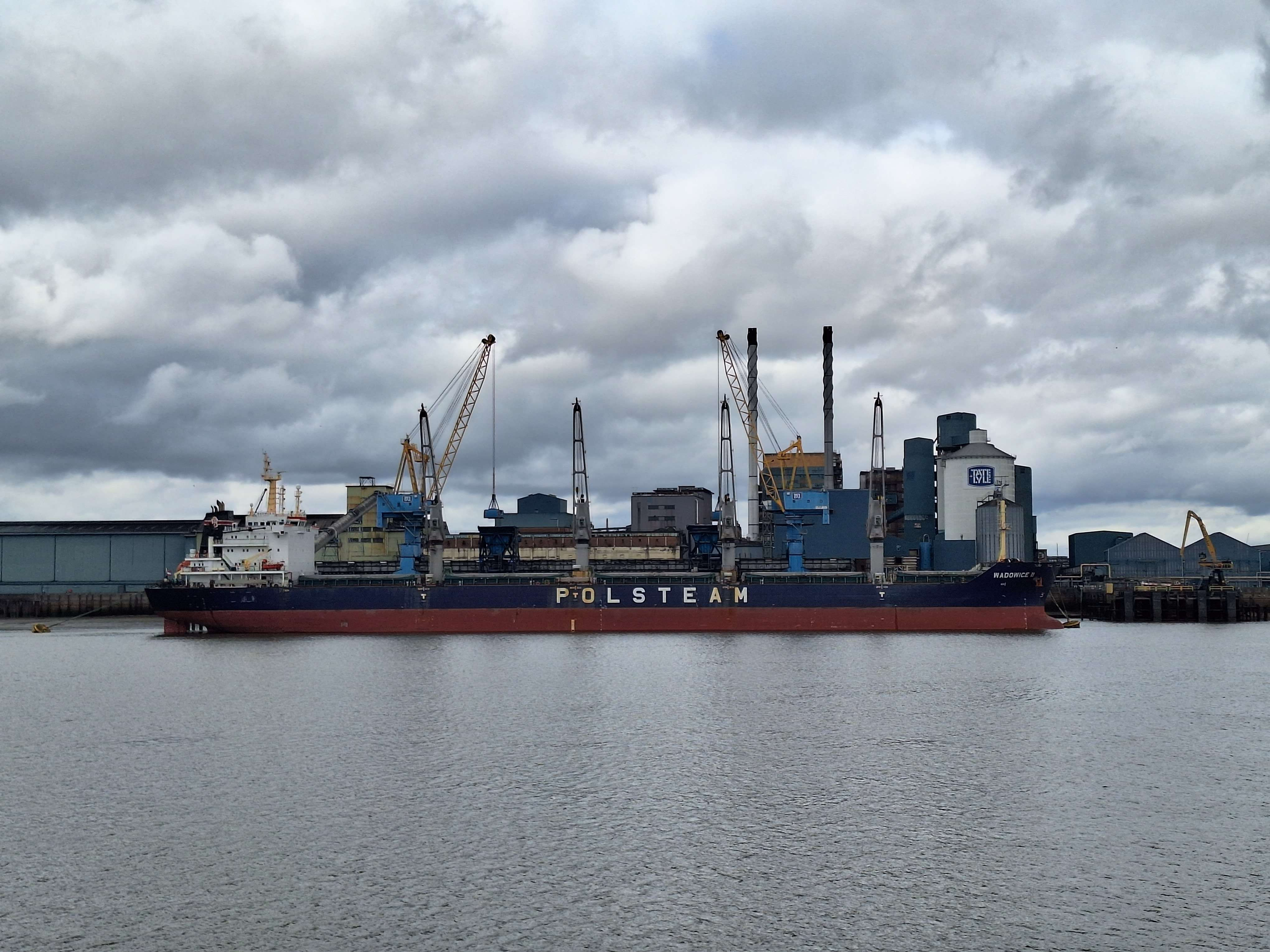
MS Wadowice II

== See also ==
- Unity Line
- Polish Merchant Navy
- PAZIM
