= SS Toruń =

French bulk carrier

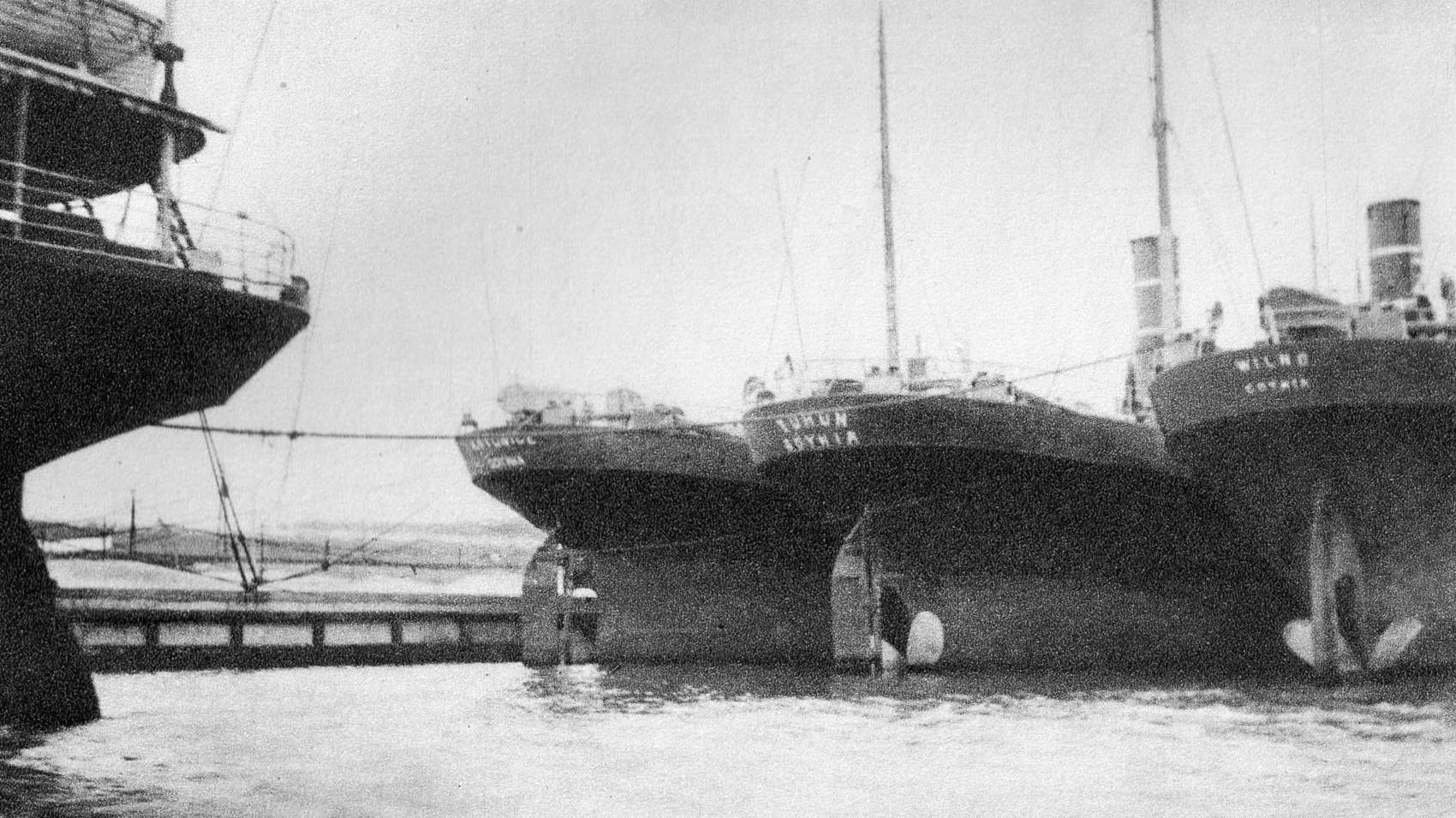
Toruń (middle), Wilno (right) and Katowice (left)

SS Toruń was a bulk carrier built in 1925 in the French shipyard Chantiers Navals Français in Caen. The sister ships were SS Wilno, SS Katowice, SS Poznań and SS Kraków. These ships were usually called "carbon carriers," or "French" because of their origin.

== Before war ==
Toruń entered Gdynia in January 1927. The ceremony of consecrating and raising the Polish flag was attended by the then Minister of Industry and Trade, the builder of the port in Gdynia Eugeniusz Kwiatkowski. The ship sailed, carrying Polish coal, mainly on the Baltic Sea and the North Sea, and from English ports to the county Thomasine.

== Under German flag ==
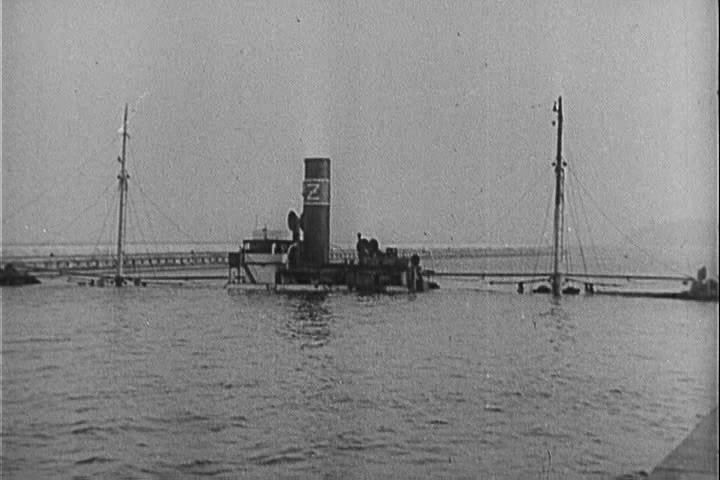
The sunken Toruń blocking the southern entrance to Gdynia, 1939

At the outbreak of World War II, Toruń was moored in the port of Gdynia as a bunker ship for naval vessels. When, under pressure from Wehrmacht troops, the defenders of the city had to withdraw from it, they sank the ship at the entrance to the port.

The Germans quickly raised Toruń, renovated and conscripted it into service under the name Hannes Freymann. It sailed in this role until 1944, when it was bombed and sunk by allied planes in the Norwegian fjord. Once again raised and provisionally patched up, it was towed away for repair in Kiel. There, however, the chains let go, the ship settled at the bottom of the pool and so it lived to see the end of the war.

== Post-war ==
After raising and renovation, Toruń was returned to the Polish Merchant Navy in May 1946. It sailed under the Polish flag until 1960, when it was finally withdrawn from service and handed over to the Port Authority in Gdańsk as a floating magazine MP-ZP Gda 20.

In 1965 Toruń was sold for scrap.

== Bibliography ==
Miciński, Jerzy (1996). Księga polskich statków. Gdańsk: Polnord-Oskar. ISBN 83-86181-23-0.

Piwoński, Jan (1989). Flota spod biało-czerwonej. Warsaw: Nasza Księgarnia. ISBN 83-10-08902-3.
