= HMNZS Hawea (F422) =

1944 Loch-class frigate

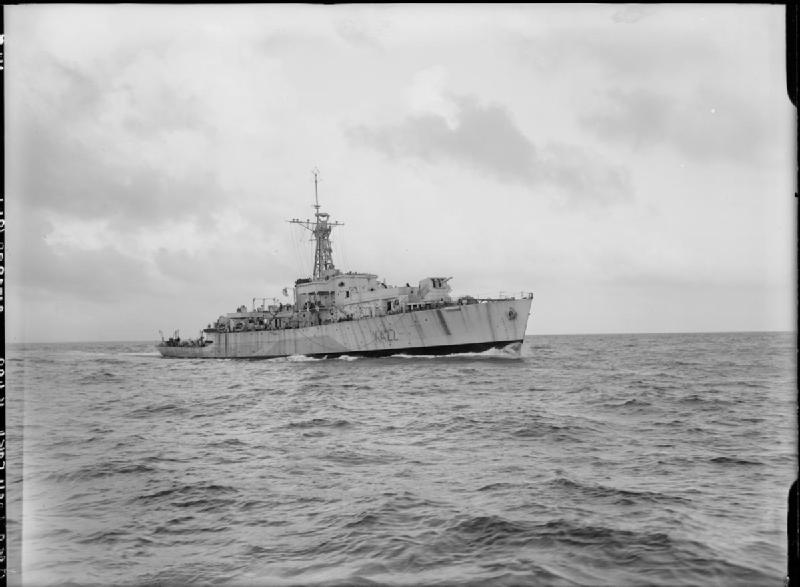
- Loch Eck in October 1944

History

United Kingdom
- Name: HMS Loch Eck
- Namesake: Loch Eck
- Ordered: 25 January 1943
- Builder: Smiths Dock Company, Middlesbrough
- Yard number: 1129
- Laid down: 25 October 1943
- Launched: 25 April 1944
- Commissioned: 7 November 1944
- Decommissioned: 13 August 1946
- Honours and awards: Atlantic 1945; North Sea 1945
- Fate: Sold to New Zealand, 1948

New Zealand
- Name: HMNZS Hawea
- Namesake: Lake Hāwea
- Acquired: 7 September 1948
- Commissioned: 1 October 1948
- Decommissioned: 15 February 1957
- Reclassified: Training ship in 1961
- Motto: Kia Toa; ("Be brave")
- Honours and awards: Korea 1951-53
- Fate: Sold for breaking up, September 1965

General characteristics
- Class & type: Loch-class frigate
- Displacement: 1,435 long tons standard; 2,250 tons full load
- Length: 87.2 m (286 ft) p/p; 93.7 m (307 ft) o/a
- Beam: 11.8 m (39 ft)
- Draught: 4.3 m (14 ft) full load
- Propulsion: 2 Admiralty 3-drum boilers; 2 shafts; 4-cylinder vertical triple expansion reciprocating engines; 5,500 ihp (4,100 kW)
- Speed: 19.5 knots (36.1 km/h)
- Range: 730 tons oil fuel, 9,500 nautical miles (17,600 km) at 12 knots (22 km/h)
- Complement: 114
- Armament: 1 × QF 4 inch Mark V on one single mounting HA MkIII**; 4 × QF 2-pounder MkVII on 1 quad mount MkVII; 2 × 40 mm Bofors A/A on 2 single mounts Mk.III; Up to 8 × 20 mm Oerlikon A/A on single mounts MkIII; 2 × Squid triple barreled A/S mortars; 1 rail and 2 throwers for depth charges

HMNZS Hawea (F422), formerly HMS Loch Eck (K422), was one of six Loch-class frigates that served in both the Royal Navy (RN) and the Royal New Zealand Navy (RNZN). The ship was laid down by Smiths Dock on 25 October 1943, launched on 25 April 1944 and commissioned into the Royal Navy as HMS Loch Eck on 7 November 1944.

== Royal Navy service ==
Loch Eck joined the 10th Escort Group in the Western Approaches in December 1944 for anti-submarine patrols and support for convoy escorts. In January 1945 the Group was transferred to Scapa Flow for anti-submarine operations in the Faeroes–Iceland Gap. On 3 February she sank the German submarine U-327 north-west of Shetland with her Squid (mortar) after Hedgehog (mortar) attacks by the frigates Bayntun and Braithwaite. On 14 February she took part in the sinking of U-989, and on the 17 February of U-1278 in the same area.

In March the Group was redeployed in the English Channel and South-Western Approaches as "Force 38". In April Loch Eck carried out trials of new sonobuoy submarine detection equipment. On 23 May the ship was attached to Rosyth Command to support "Operation Doomsday", the reoccupation of Norway. On 1 June she escorted U-2529 from Kristiansund to Loch Eriboll as part of "Operation Deadlight", returning to Norway on 6 June as part of the escort for Convoy RN1 taking King Haakon VII of Norway to Oslo.

After a refit at the Charles Hill & Sons shipyard in Bristol in June and July, she sailed for the Indian Ocean in August, to join the East Indies Escort Force. There she carried out Guard ship and military support duties, as well as the repatriation of military and civilian personnel. She was also present at the formal Japanese surrender of Bali in February 1946 and at Lombok in March. She sailed for home in May, but her return to the UK was delayed after a collision in Colombo with a Navy cutter. She returned to Devonport to decommission on 13 August 1946.

== Transfer to New Zealand ==
Loch Ech was one of six Loch-class frigates sold to the Royal New Zealand Navy. Renamed HMNZS Hawea, she was acquired on 7 September 1948, and commissioned on 1 October 1948.

Since the Admiralty named the Loch-class ships after Scottish lakes, the six in New Zealand service were renamed after New Zealand lakes. Lake Hāwea is a glacial lake located in the Central Otago region of New Zealand. The name is Māori and is thought to refer to a local tribe although the exact meaning is uncertain. Hawea was the first of three ships with this name to serve in the Royal New Zealand Navy.

== Royal New Zealand Navy service ==
After commissioning at Devonport Hawea sailed for the Mediterranean with three other Loch-class frigates. After exercises with the Mediterranean Fleet in November, she sailed for Auckland, via the Suez Canal and Indian Ocean, arriving in January 1949 to join the 11th Frigate Flotilla.

On 22 March 1949 Hawea participated in sinking the coal hulk Occident in Palliser Bay.

In 1949 Hawea carried out patrols in the Pacific, visiting Suva, Fiji and Samoa. After a refit from October to February 1950 she was transferred on loan to 2nd Frigate Flotilla of the Mediterranean Fleet, with her sister ship Taupo joining the flotilla at Malta in May for Fleet exercises and cruises. She returned to Auckland in November.

=== Korean War ===
The Korean War started on 25 June 1950 when North Korean forces crossed the 38°N parallel and invaded South Korea. The New Zealand Government decided to maintain two frigates in support of a United Nations Naval Force assisting South Korea. Hawea's sister ships, Pukaki and Tutira, were hurriedly prepared for war service and sailed for Sasebo, their main base in Japan, on 3 July 1950. They did escort and patrol services, often working with Commonwealth, South Korean and other Allied ships, and in support of amphibious landings. The frigates were rotated in turn with the other four Loch frigates.

In February 1951 Hawea sailed to Kure, Japan, to join the United Nations Task Force. On 18 May she shelled a gun position on the coast, the first time that an RNZN ship fired on the enemy. From June to December she provided navigational data for bombardments in the Han River estuary, shelling rail traffic and maintaining a blockade. On 15 September 1951, Hawea swamped a 7.6-metre (25 ft) motor boat which sank in the Han River estuary while navigating swift tidal channels to reach a bombardment position.

In February 1952 she was relieved by Rotoiti, returning to Auckland on 8 March. She had spent 272 days at sea, steamed 55,000 miles, and fired 21,000 rounds of ammunition. After refit and maintenance at Auckland from April to June she returned to Korea in October for further operations. After the Armistice Agreement of July 1953 she returned to Auckland, arriving there in August.

=== Later service ===
After a refit she returned to the 11th Frigate Flotilla in February 1954 for patrols and port visits. In December 1956 she and Pukaki escorted the supply ship Endeavour in a passage to the Southern Ocean, sailing from Bluff to the edge of the pack ice.

== Decommissioning and fate ==
On 15 February 1957 Hawea was decommissioned and put into reserve. The ship was used as a Harbour Training ship in Auckland until sold for breaking up in September 1965. On 15 November 1965 Hawea and sister ship Pukaki were towed by the tug Atlas to a breaker's yard in Hong Kong.

== See also ==
- Frigates of the Royal New Zealand Navy

== Bibliography ==
- Boniface, Patrick (2013). Loch Class Frigates. Maritime Books. ISBN 978-1-904459-54-5.
- Colledge, J. J.; Warlow, Ben (2006) [1969]. Ships of the Royal Navy: The Complete Record of All Fighting Ships of the Royal Navy from the 15th Century to the Present (3rd Rev ed.). London: Chatham Publishing. ISBN 978-1-86176-281-8. OCLC 67375475.
- McDougall, R J (1989) New Zealand Naval Vessels. Page 37–41. Government Printing Office. ISBN 978-0-477-01399-4
