= Vlastimir Kusik =

Croatian art historian (1953–2018)

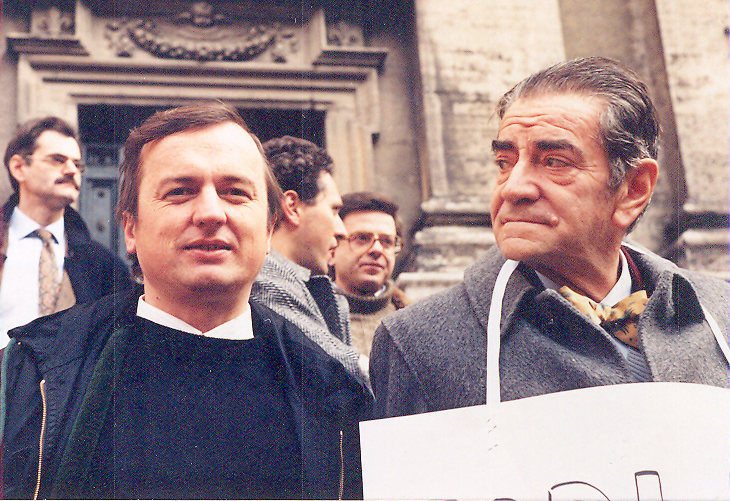
- Vlastimir Kusik and Bruno Zevi, Rome, 1989
- Born: 1953; Osijek
- Died: 2018 (aged 64–65); Osijek
- Scientific career
- Fields: Art history
- Institutions: Gallery of Fine Arts, Osijek, University of Osijek

Vlastimir Kusik (Osijek, 1953 – Osijek, 2018), was a Croatian art historian, art critic and long-term curator of the Gallery of Fine Arts, Osijek.

== Biography ==
Kusik was born in Osijek, Croatia; he studied art history and archaeology in the University of Zagreb and graduated in 1976.

Between 1977 and 1981, he worked in Regional conservation institute for Slavonia in Osijek.

After that, he worked as a curator of the Gallery of Fine Arts, Osijek. In his professional career, the self-denying Kusik wrote more than five hundred scientific papers professional essays and organized about a hundred exhibitions. He particularly focused on artists related to Osijek and Slavonia, such as Julije Knifer, Đuro Seder, Oscar Nemon and many others.

In the 1980s, he became politically active as a member of the Pannella Italian Radical Party and was one of the founders Radical Association for the United States of Europe in Zagreb.

Vlastimir is merit for Pannella sojourn in Osijek to celebrate the New Year on 31 December 1991, despite constant artillery attacks from Serbian forces.
