= European Avenue =

Street in Osijek, Croatia

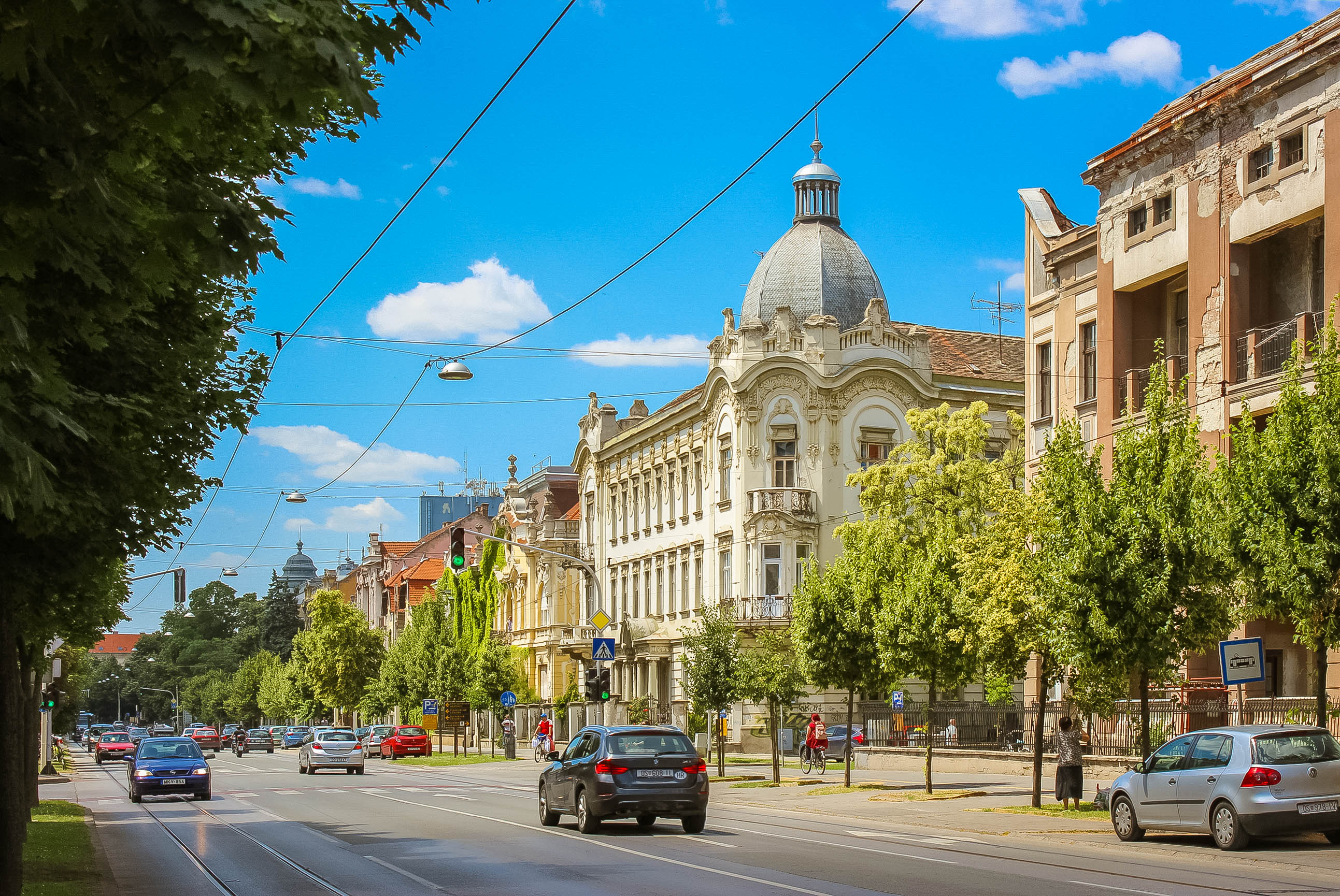
- Interactive map of European Avenue
- Native name: Europska avenija (Croatian)
- Former name(s): Chavrakova ulica (1904–1919); Aleksandrova ulica (1919–1941); Ulica Ante Starčevića (1941–1946); Bulevar generalissimusa Staljina (1946–1948); Bulevar Jugoslavenske narodne armije (1948–1991); Europska avenija (1993–present)
- Location: Osijek, Croatia
- East: Duke Trpimir Street
- West: Stjepan Radić Street

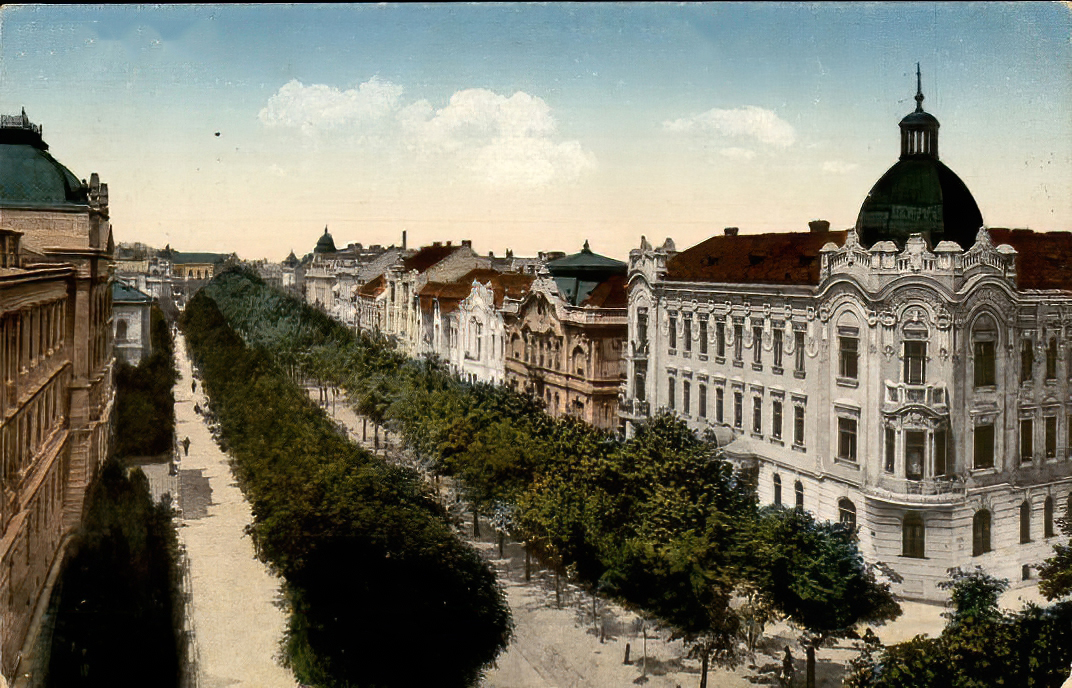
European Avenue in Osijek in the period 1910–1920

European Avenue (Croatian: Europska avenija) is a street in Osijek, Croatia. It is the most representative and perhaps beautiful street in Osijek, with its string of secession buildings.

== History ==
Osijek is particularly famous for its Secessionist architecture, a style very popular throughout the former Austro-Hungarian Empire. The magnificent row of palaces on European Avenue—today mostly used as office spaces and local government buildings—were built at the beginning of the 20th century in the style of the so-called "Viennese secession." However, the largest of these buildings, the Postanska palača, was built in the style of "the Hungarian secession." In the same street there are a number of classicist buildings from the 19th century including the Municipal Court of Osijek. Of all the houses on this street, the most visited would probably be the Museum of Fine Arts, where there is a wealth of paintings and sculptures depicting the region. Some of the most interesting paintings are portraits of Slavonian noble families from the 18th and 19th centuries and the romantic landscapes of Slavonia and Baranja, as well as works of the founder of Osijek's drawing school Hugo Conrad Von Hötzendorff and Adolf Waldinger.

Timeline:

- By the end of the 19th century this street was extension of Kapucinska Street, with only few buildings on southern side of street.
- In 1894, the Palace of Croatian Chamber of Economy was built in the historicist style.
- In 1897, the Neumann building, today the home of Gallery of Fine Arts was built in the Italian renaissance style.
- From 1904 to 1906, on northern side of street were built a string of secession buildings. At this time the street was called Chavrakova Street (Croatian: Chavrakova ulica).
- In 1919, the street was renamed to Aleksandrova Street (Croatian: Aleksandrova ulica). It was called after then Yugoslav king Alexander.
- In 1941, the street was renamed to Ante Starčević Street (Croatian: Ulica Ante Starčevića). It was called after Croatian politician Ante Starčević.
- In 1946, the street was renamed to Boulevard of generalissimo Stalin (Croatian: Bulevar generalissimusa Staljina). It was called after Soviet dictator Joseph Stalin.
- In 1948, the street was renamed to Boulevard of Yugoslav People's Army (Croatian: Bulevar Jugoslavenske narodne armije). It was called after Yugoslav People's Army.
- In 1993, the street was renamed to European Avenue.
- In 2017, a number of the facade of many of the buildings were renovated, including the Municipal Court, partially by EU funds.

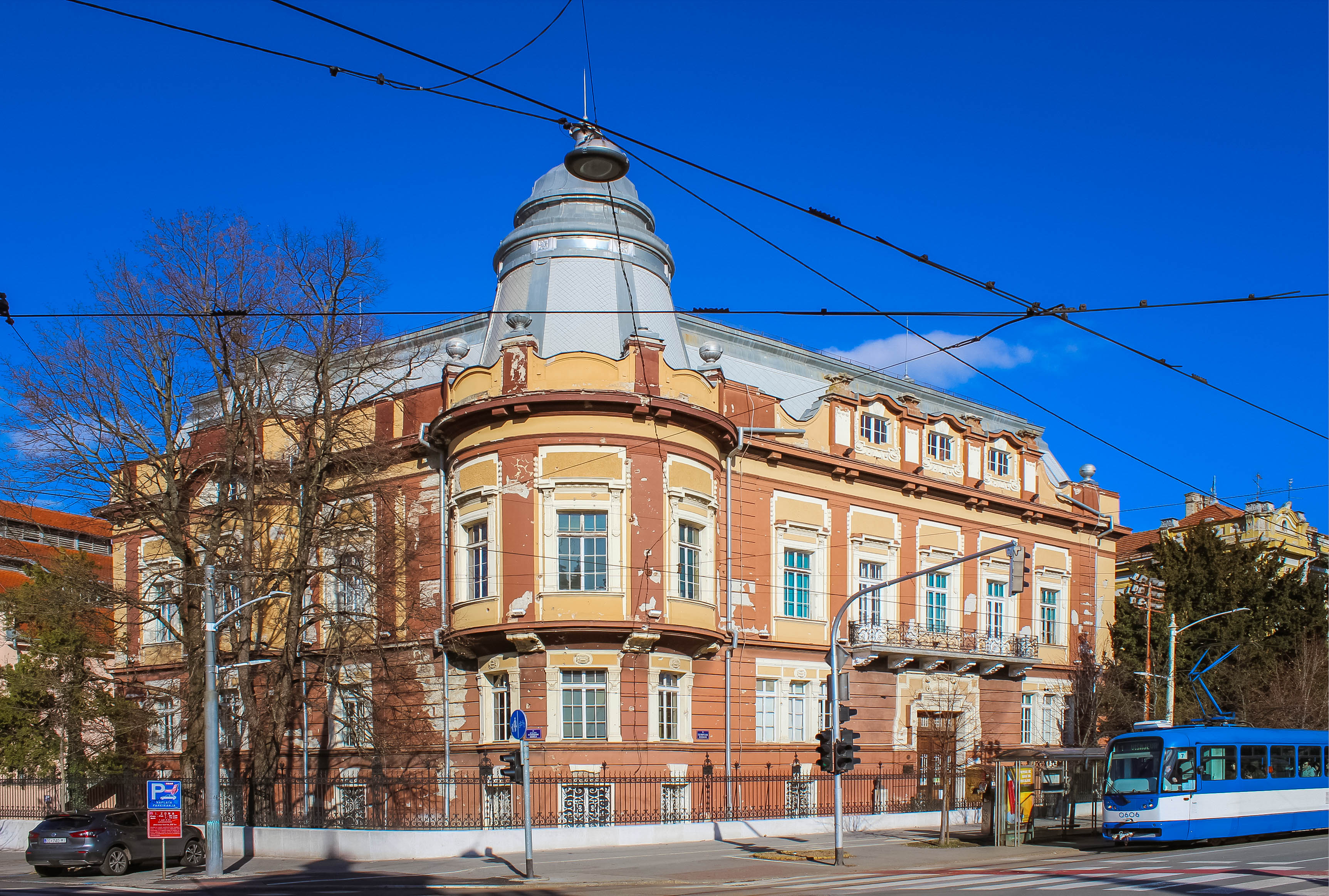
House Gillming-Hengl - built in 1906

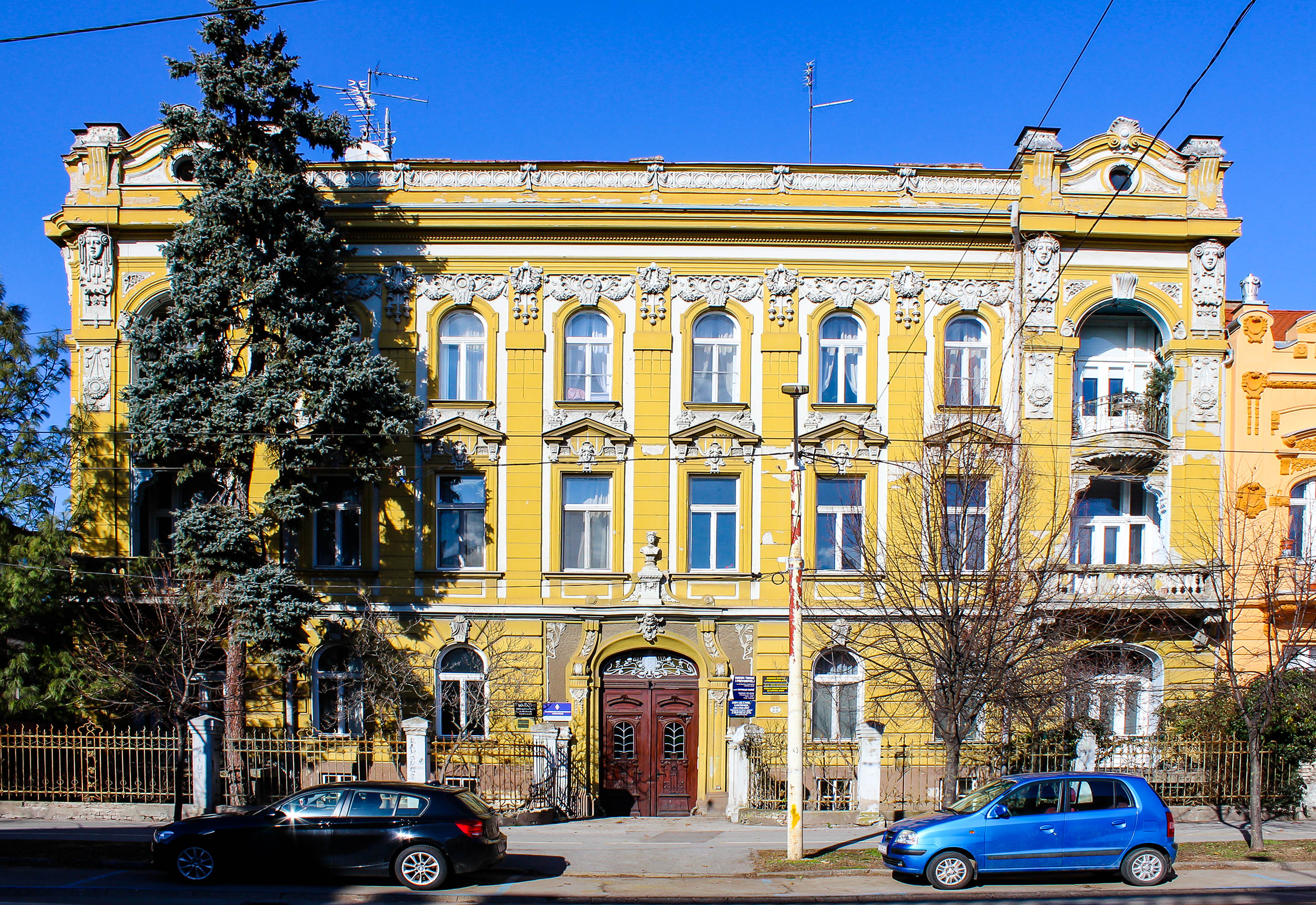
House Povischil - built in 1904

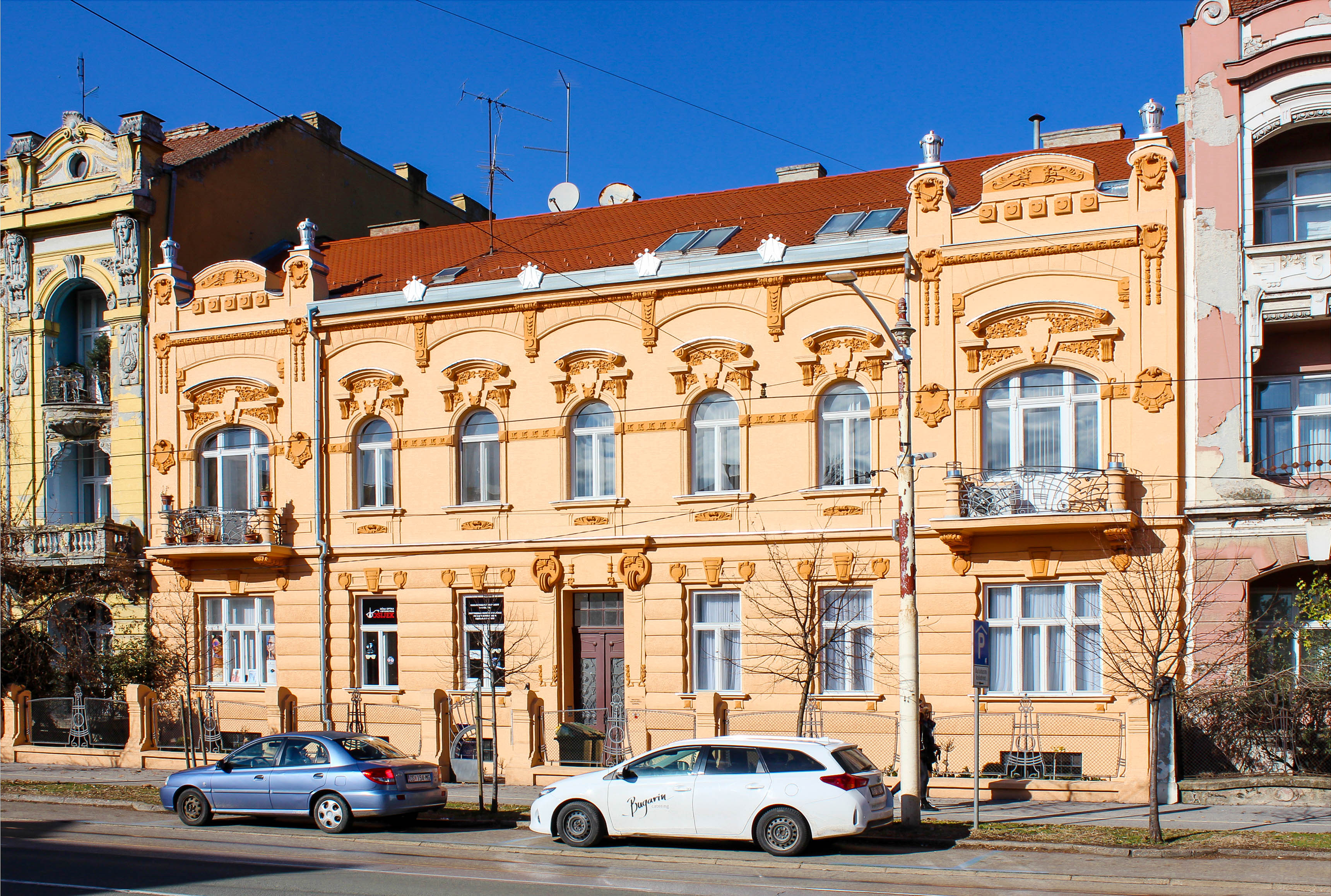
House Nayer - built in 1904

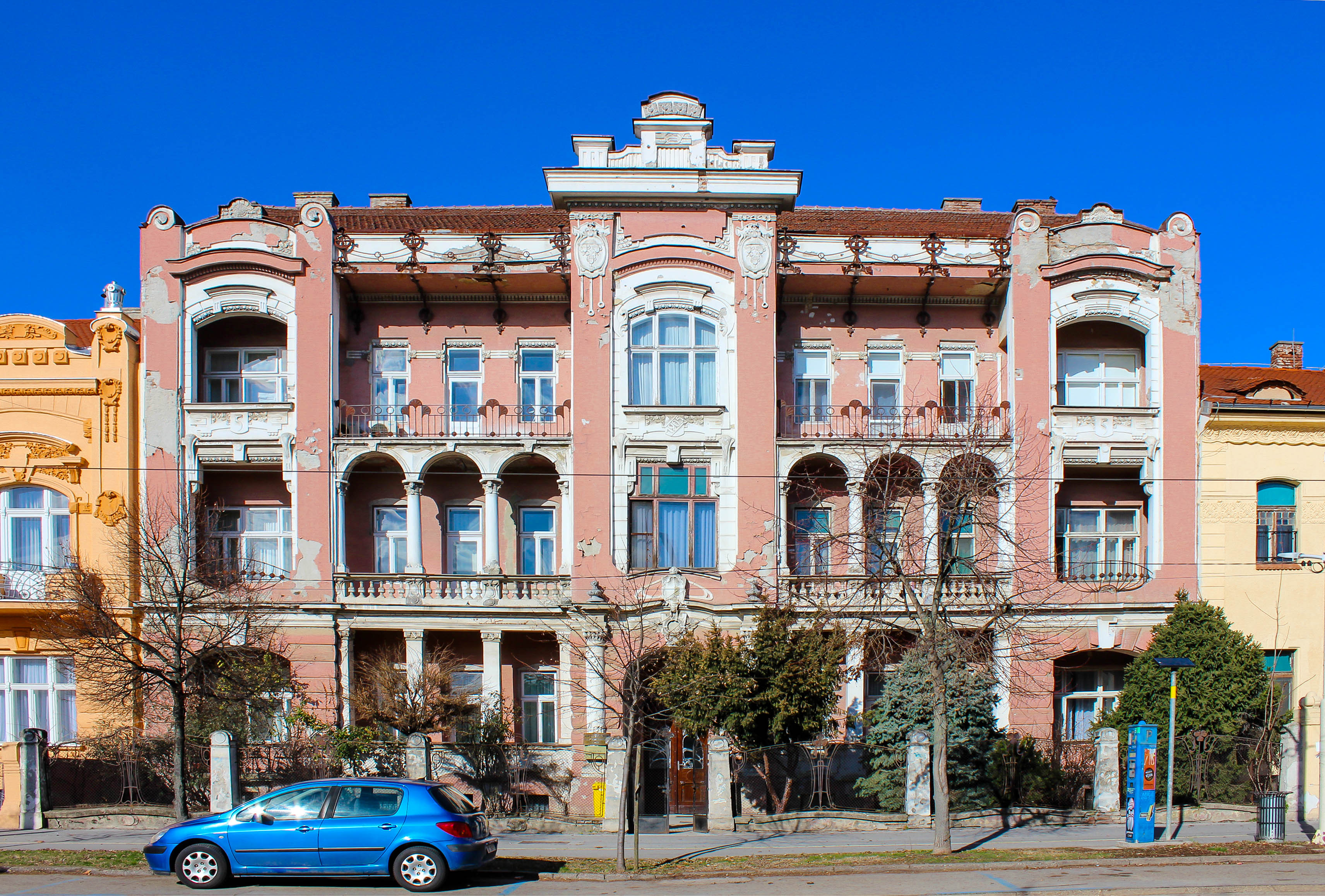
House Sauter - built in 1905

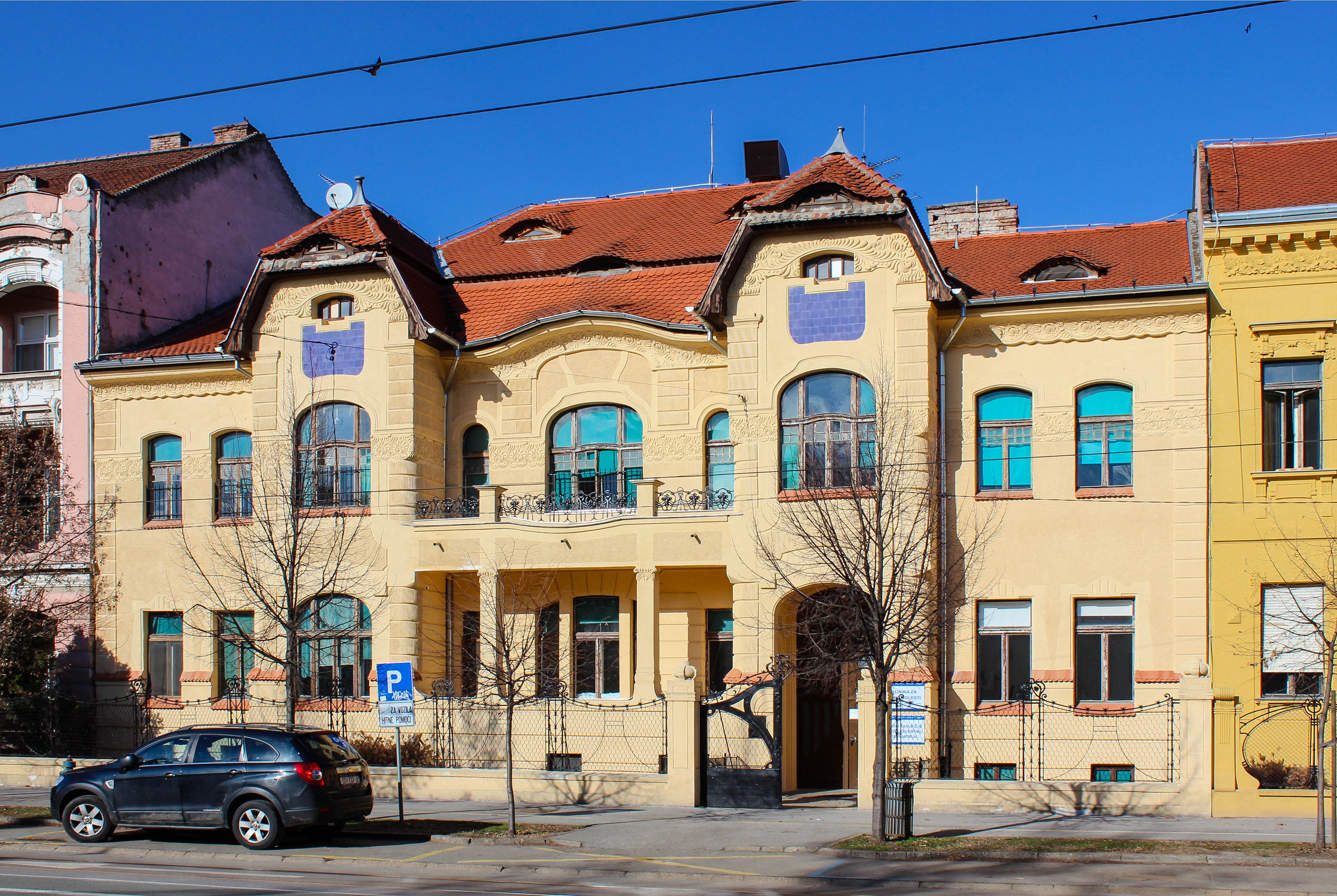
House Korsky - built in 1904

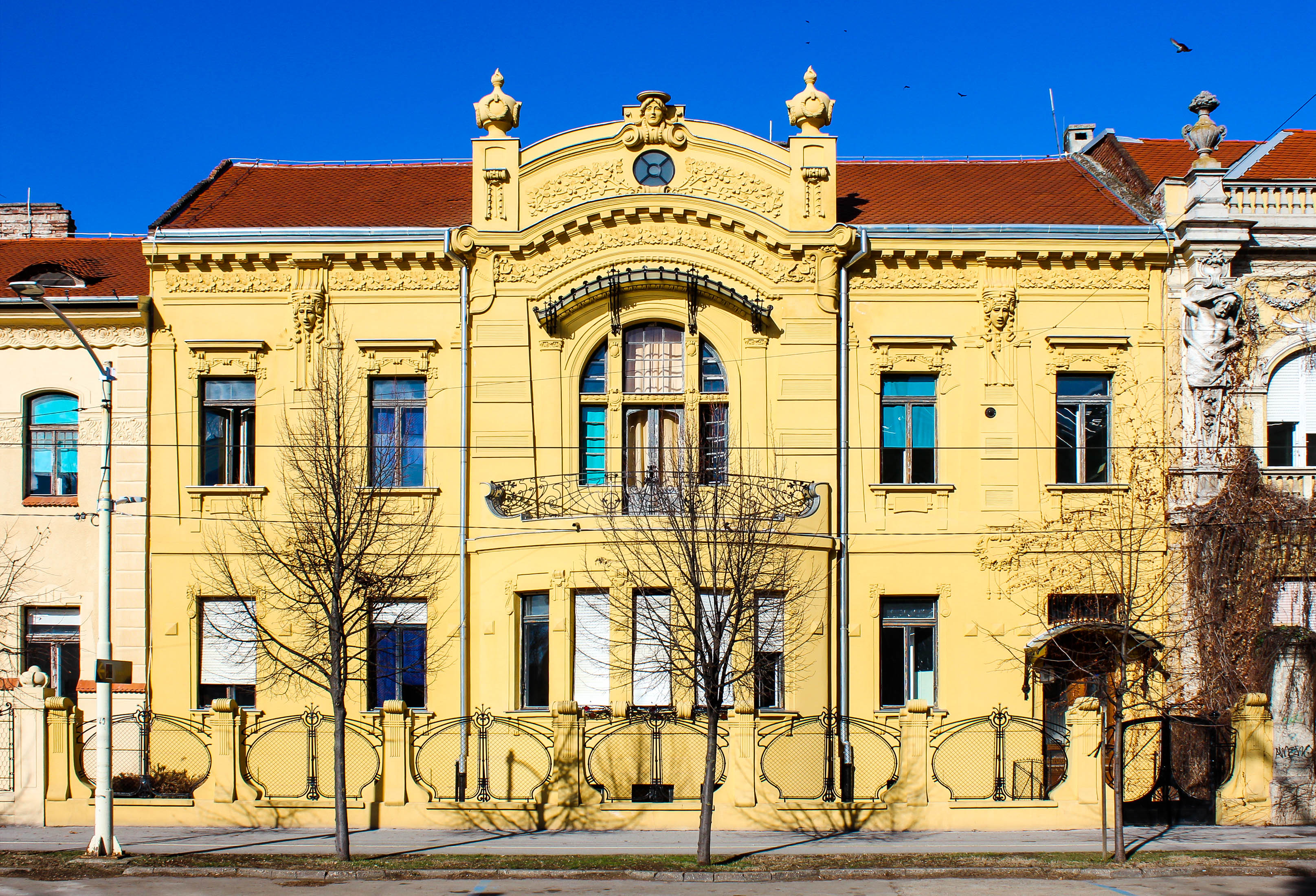
House Spitzer - built in 1905

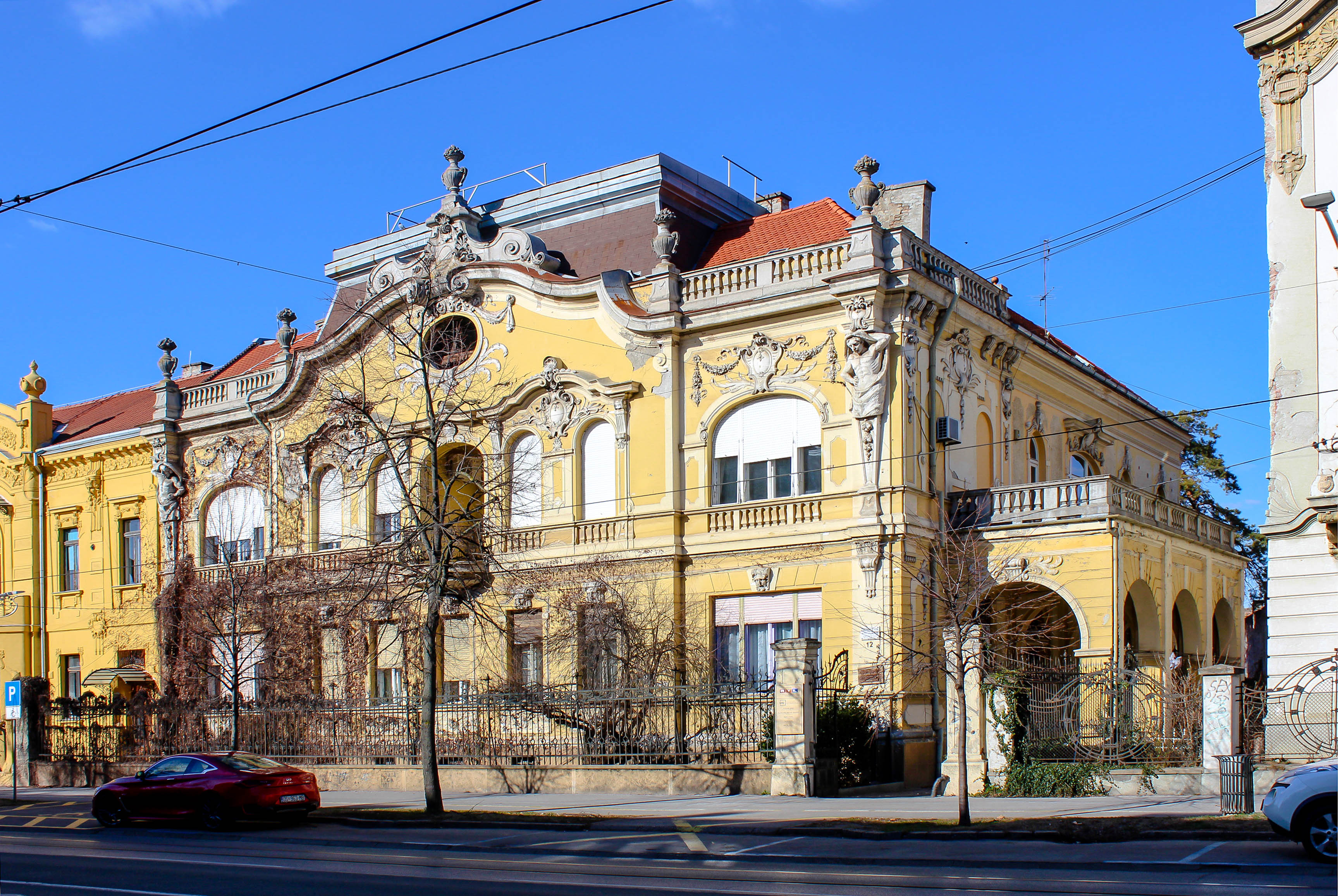
House Schmidt - built in 1905

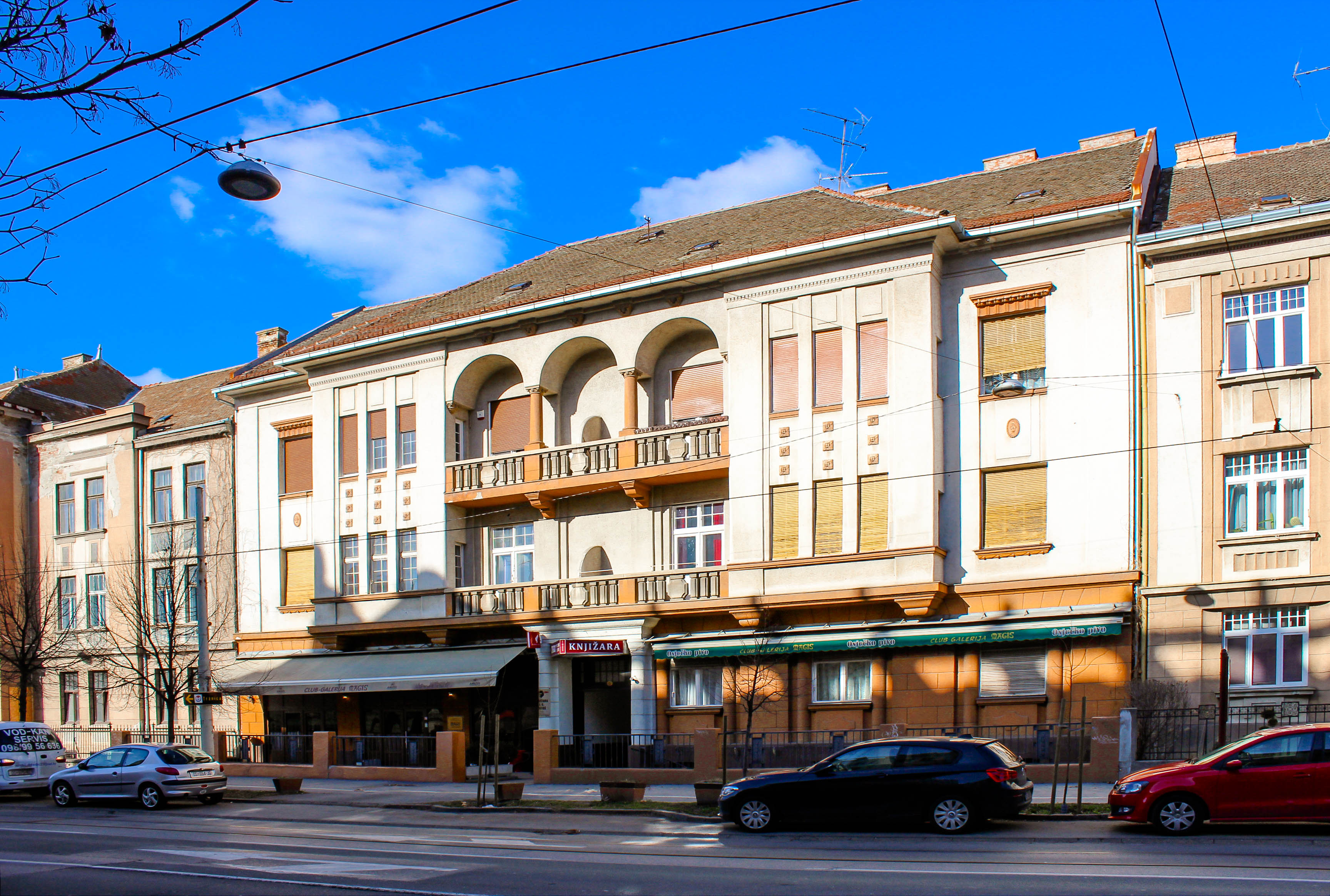
House Grčić - built in 1914-15

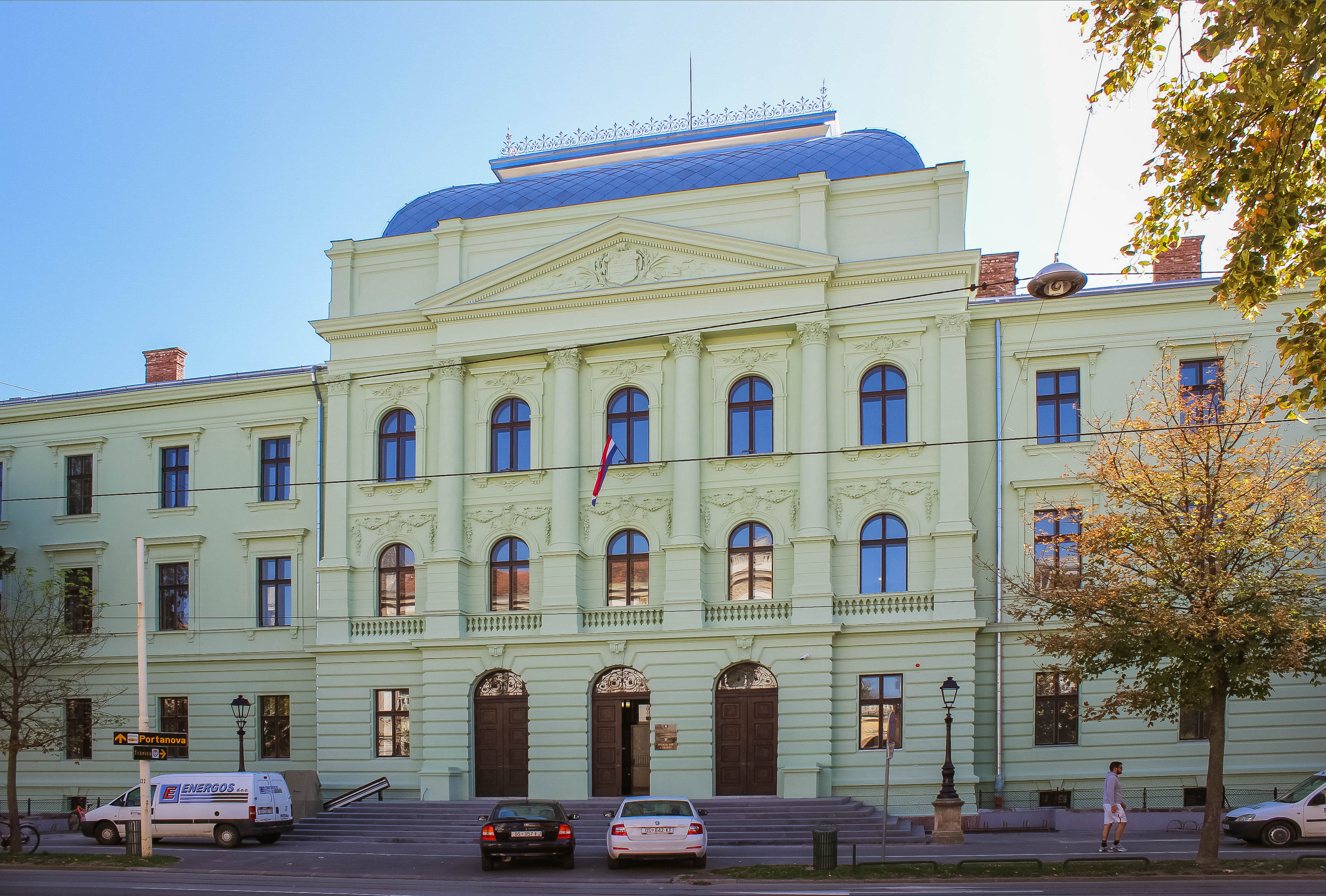
The Palace of the Royal Judicial Table in Osijek - today the Municipal Court, built 1898.

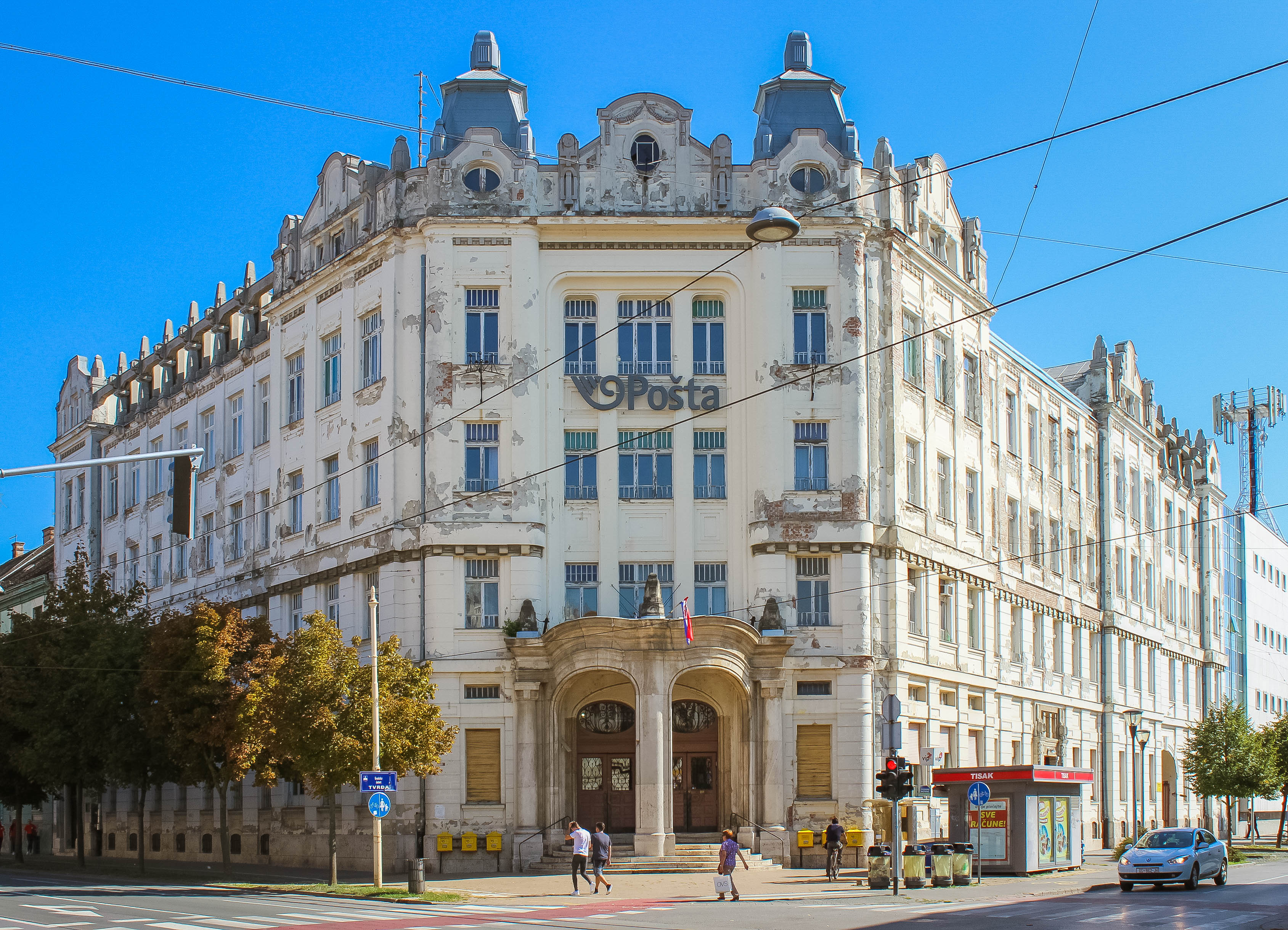
Postal palace - built in 1912

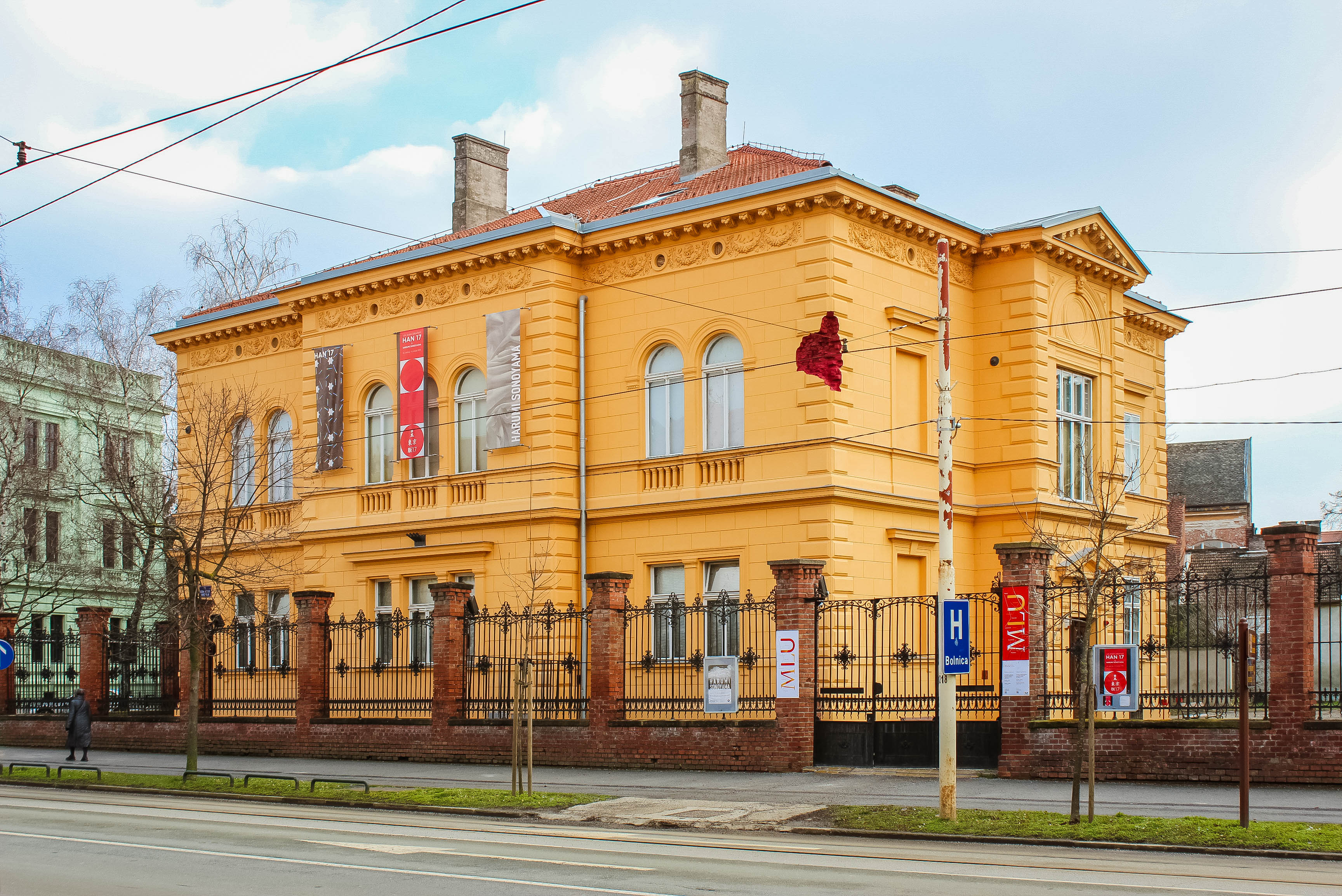
House Neumann - Today Museum of fine arts

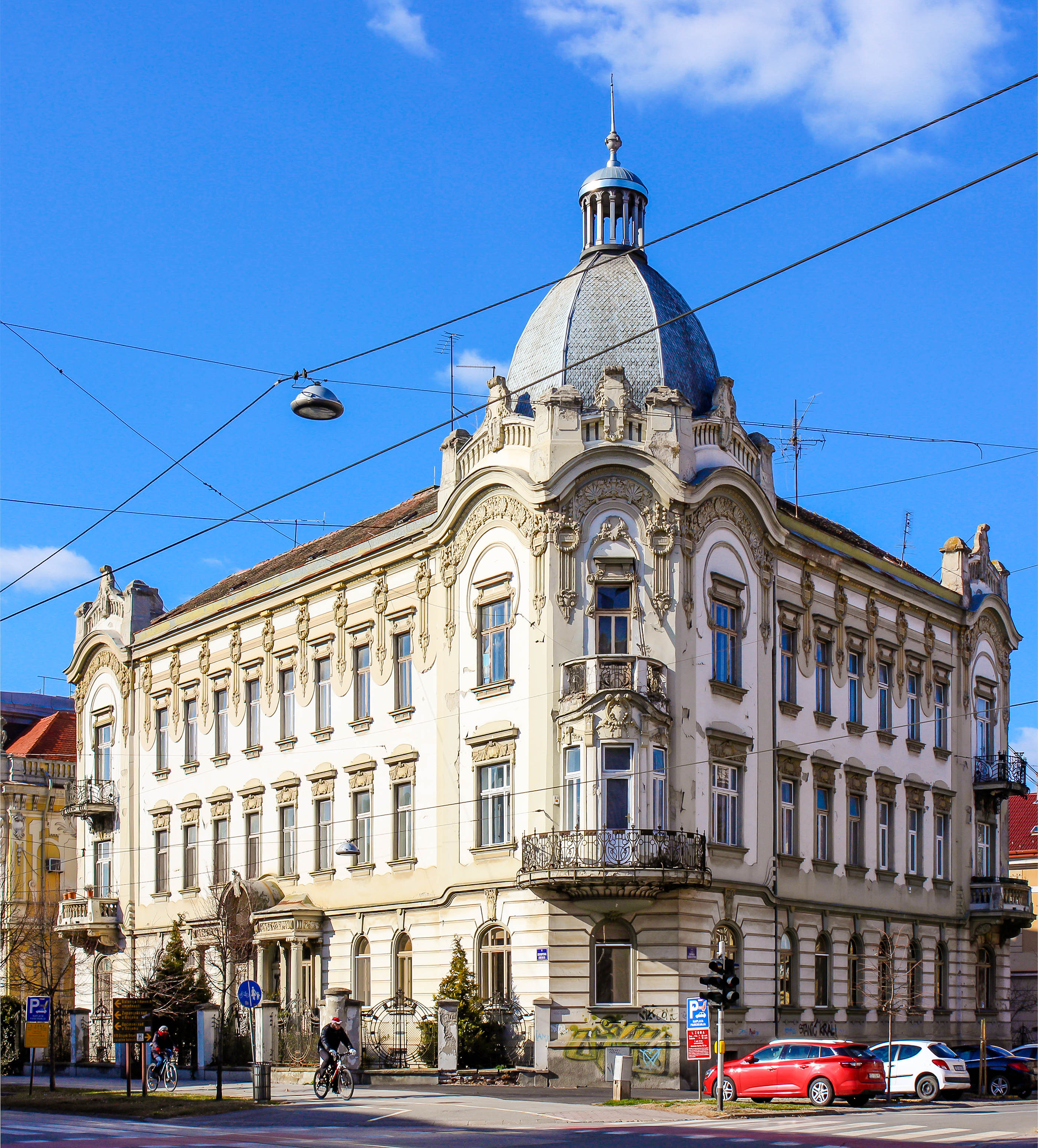
House Sekulić-Plavšić

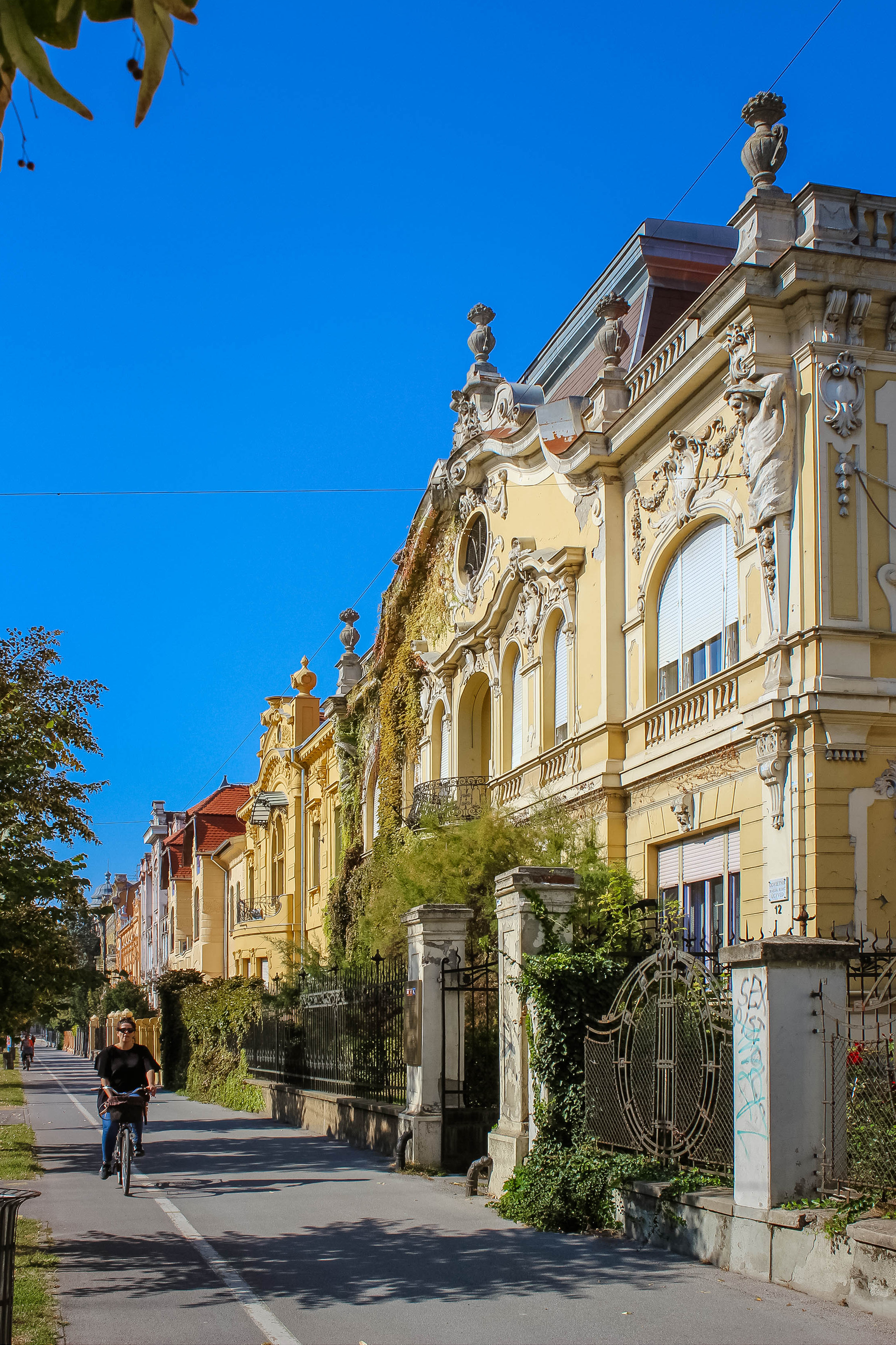
Northern side of European avenue
