= Museum of Fine Arts, Osijek =

Museum of Fine Arts
- Muzej likovnih umjetnosti
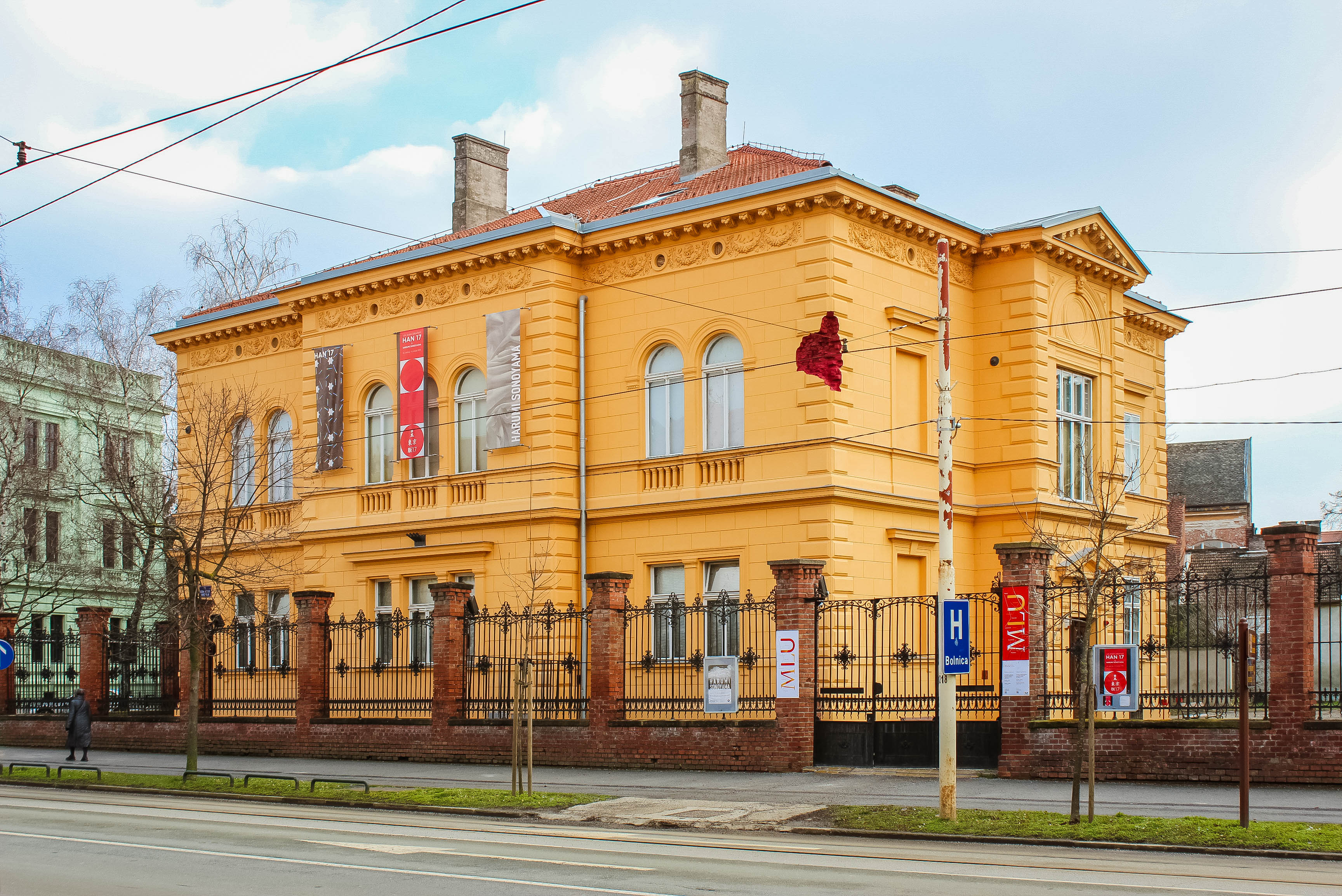
- Museum of Fine Arts
- Established: 1954; 72 years ago
- Location: Osijek, Croatia
- Coordinates: 45°33′30″N 18°41′50″E
- Type: Gallery
- Director: Eduard Hudolin
- Curators: Ivan Roth; Valentina Radoš; Mateja Moser; Dario Vuger; Anja Kindl
- Website: www.mlu.hr

The Museum of Fine Arts (Croatian: Muzej likovnih umjetnosti) is an art museum in Osijek, Croatia. It was established in 1954.

The Museum of Fine Arts in Osijek collects, preserves, researches and presents artistic heritage ranging from the Baroque to recent art. The Museum's holdings are divided into several collections, the contents of which consist of paintings, drawings, graphics, sculptures and medals from the 18th, 19th, 20th and 21st centuries. The foundation of the museum's holdings are works, many of which are of capital importance for Croatian artistic heritage from the mid-18th century to the present day, and for which the Osijek Museum, as a museum institution of the regional center, is the best known and most recognized.

This primarily refers to the works of foreign masters of the late Baroque, Classicism and Romanticism, then the first generation of Croatian landscape and portrait painters of the mid-19th century, and works from the turn of the 20th century and its first half, when Croatian modern painting was established. Furthermore, there are works of classic Croatian neomodernism and contemporary art, for now without the desired scope, but undoubtedly with credible quality. The most extensive and valuable part of the museum's holdings are the painting collections. The painting collection of the Museum of Fine Arts is unique in Croatia in terms of the number and value of works of art that were owned by Slavonian noble families from the 18th and 19th centuries. These works constitute a very valuable part of the national cultural heritage, which is also part of the Central European cultural corpus. In addition, the Museum represents the widest range of all Osijek artists, predominantly from the first half of the 20th century, and the largest part of their artistic creations. The exhibition program, as the most present form of activity of the Museum of Fine Arts, has its strongholds in presenting the artists of the city and region, national heritage, and fostering international cooperation, especially with neighbors and abroad in the broadest sense. In addition to solo and retrospective exhibitions, the Museum traditionally organizes the following art events: the Slavonian Biennale, the Ivo Kerdić Memorial – Triennial of Croatian Medals and Small Sculptures, and the Days of Printmaking.

== History ==
The history of the Museum of Fine Arts in Osijek is linked to the Museum of Slavonia, from which a collection of paintings was separated that will form the basis of the future Gallery of Fine Arts, i.e. the current Museum. This collection was created especially after the Second World War. war, by taking over the collections from the heritage of manorial castles in the Osijek area, and even then it had close to 500 works, among them such high, European artistic values. Soon, the need to separate the pictures and present them publicly to citizens became apparent, so in 1948, thanks to Dr. Josip Bösendorfer's first independent exhibition in the gallery sense was made from the existing material, located in the building on European Avenue 24. However, the life of this gallery, which was set up by Josip Leović, was very short; already after five months, all the exhibited material had to be returned to the Museum of Slavonia, because the exhibition rooms were needed for other purposes. As part of the holdings of the Museum of Slavonia, the collection remained until 1952, when it acquired premises in the former county building, opposite the Croatian National Theatre, in today's Županijska street.

This gallery, built according to the museum concept of Zdenka Munk and installed by Osijek artists Josip Leović and Jovan Gojković, took on a representative character and represented an institution of high cultural rank for the city of Osijek. In 1954, the Picture Gallery was separated from the Museum of Slavonia and became independent with the first c. d. manager, painter Jovan Gojković.

Even before that, in 1953, the first catalog of the gallery was published, edited by J. Gojković. A year after independence and separation, the Picture Gallery had to suddenly leave its premises and stop working, because new needs for these premises dictated it. It was closed in 1955, and its holdings, now numbering over 1,000 items, were placed and stored in new locations and various attics, often unsuitable for such purposes. Although the Gallery was not abolished as an independent institution, the administrative part was placed in a space of the Music School, but it only vegetated there. In the meantime, after the death of J. Gojković, in 1957, Drago Dodigović, an art historian, was appointed in his place.

Individual exhibitions from the museum's holdings were signs of the Gallery's existence, and they have once again drawn attention to its artistic treasures, which has borne fruit, especially with the involvement of the painter and academician Ljubo Babić. The extensive and high-quality artistic holdings could no longer be kept hidden and scattered, and the adaptation of the building at 9 European Avenue, where the material was given a proper place for presentation to the public. The Gallery of Fine Arts was opened there in 1964, and at the same time a catalogue of the permanent exhibition was printed, with a preface, catalogue data and reproductions. The museum acquired its permanent residence at this address, and it still exists there today, developing an ever-increasing museum, or rather collecting, exhibition activity, artistic, educational and research activities. In 2014, the name of the museum was changed from the Gallery of Fine Arts to the Museum of Fine Arts. Unfortunately, the spatial capacities of the building in which the Museum is located no longer meet the needs required by its current extensive and dynamic exhibition program. Contemporary Curators are increasingly faced with the problem of the impossibility of simultaneously operating temporary exhibitions and the permanent display, which must be removed upon the arrival of each major exhibition.

== About the building ==
The building of the Museum of Fine Arts is located on European Avenue, a representative Art Nouveau and historicist architectural and urban ensemble of the city of Osijek. The construction of this urban development, which connects the Upper Town and the Citadel, began in the last decades of the 19th century - in the period from 1883 to 1900, the southern side of the then Chavrakova Street (today's European Avenue) was built, where representative historicist free-standing residential buildings with front gardens were erected - among others, the neo-Renaissance building of Dr. D. Neuman, today's Museum of Fine Arts. In the first decade of the 20th century, the northern side of the street was also built, with luxurious Art Nouveau residential city palaces with front gardens and decorative iron fences. With the construction of European Avenue, Osijek acquired a representative architectural and urban characteristic of a Central European city.

The building of today's museum was built in 1895, according to a design by architect Josip Vancaš (1859–1932). It was built as a family home for Osijek lawyer Dr. Dragutin Neuman, founder of the Croatian Writers and Artists Club (there is a memorial plaque with his portrait on the eastern facade of the building, erected in 1930).

Construction began on the eastern part of the plot, where a corner two-story building was built, bordered on the east by today's Neumanova Street, and on the north by Europska Avenue. The ground plan of the building was determined by the urban design of the street space, so two large building bodies can be distinguished - the main one, facing the avenue, and an additional one, which is diagonally attached to it. In accordance with the historicist design of the spatial composition, large spacious rooms face the street, while smaller, auxiliary rooms face the courtyard.

The exterior design of the building follows the historicist principle of referring to the architectural models of the past, in this case, to the examples of Italian Renaissance palaces.

The consistency of adopting such compositional solutions and architectural motifs corresponds to strict historicism. The harmony, clarity and sense of proportion of the Renaissance expression is most evident on the main, street facade of the building, emphasized by a central projection, and opened by large biforate and triforate openings, flat-vaulted on the ground floor and arched on the first floor. The facades end with a frieze with relief decoration in terracotta, and a strongly prominent attic cornice, carried by a series of decorative consoles, also made of terracotta. The building has two entrances; the main one, emphasized by a central projection with a gable on the western side facade, and a side entrance from the southern courtyard side.

The gables and corners of the building are visually emphasized by blocks that "simulate" the construction of stone rustication. The spacious courtyard of the building is fenced off from the street by a high wrought iron fence, a superb work of artistic craftsmanship. In the courtyard there is an auxiliary low building, a "garden house" made in the same style as the main building. Since the time of its construction, the building has changed its purpose and owners several times. Before World War II, it was the family home of Dr. Dragutin Neuman. After that, it became the property of the Pfeiffer family. After the war, it was a residential space where several families lived, and was then adapted for the Women's Student Dormitory, and later for the Student Dormitory of the Technical School. In 1963, it was intended for the Gallery of Fine Arts, Osijek, today's Museum of Fine Arts. The building has 460 m² of exhibition space, 150 m² of work space and 85 m² of modernly furnished depots.

== Future reconstruction ==
Thanks to the funds from the European Union, approved for the planned construction of a new museum building, the Museum of Fine Arts is expecting fundamental changes in the very near future. Changes that lead to a "new museum" - a museum that will operate in a new space, with a new museological concept and a new permanent exhibition. After the separation of the Gallery of Fine Arts from the Museum of Slavonia and its independence as an autonomous museum institution in 1954, and after its opening ten years later at European Avenue No. 9, the address at which it is located today, where this museum has affirmed and proven itself as one of the key points of culture and art not only in the city of Osijek and Slavonia, but also on a national level, the project of reconstruction and extension of the Museum of Fine Arts is becoming the most important event in the history of this institution, but it is also becoming of essential importance for the city of Osijek itself as a city of culture and art.

The first steps in planning the adaptation and extension of the museum were taken thanks to the initiative of the director of the Museum, M.Sc. Branka Balen, Leonilda Conti and Jasminka Mesarić, and the authors of the conceptual design for the reconstruction and extension of the Museum of Fine Arts, architects Branimir Kljajić and Goran Jagić, have designed and developed an exceptionally high-quality project, which will functionally and aesthetically meet all the requirements that a modern, specialist museum institution is faced with due to the specific conditions of its functioning and the needs of modern times. The planned project reconstructs the existing building in such a way that its entire surface is put into the function of museum spaces, and on the remaining free land owned by the Museum, a new building is being built in accordance with the valid General Urban Plan of the City of Osijek and special construction conditions, in which the necessary and missing museum spaces are provided. Two pressing problems of insufficiency of museum space – related to space for permanent exhibitions and overcrowded depots in which there is no longer room for adequate accommodation of the growing number of objects from all museum collections – will be resolved by the construction of a new building. The construction of the new museum building, as an interpolation in the courtyard of the existing building and physically connected to it, is planned over the next few years. Thus, the permanent exhibition will find its place in the old building, while in the new one, one part of the exhibition space will be intended for the segment of the permanent exhibition in which works of contemporary art are presented, and another for the installation of temporary exhibitions from the annual program. Equally important, the design of the new museum building, which meets all museological standards, provides for sufficiently large spaces for several separate storage rooms for museum materials, as well as all other museum contents.

== See also ==
- List of museums in Croatia

== Gallery ==
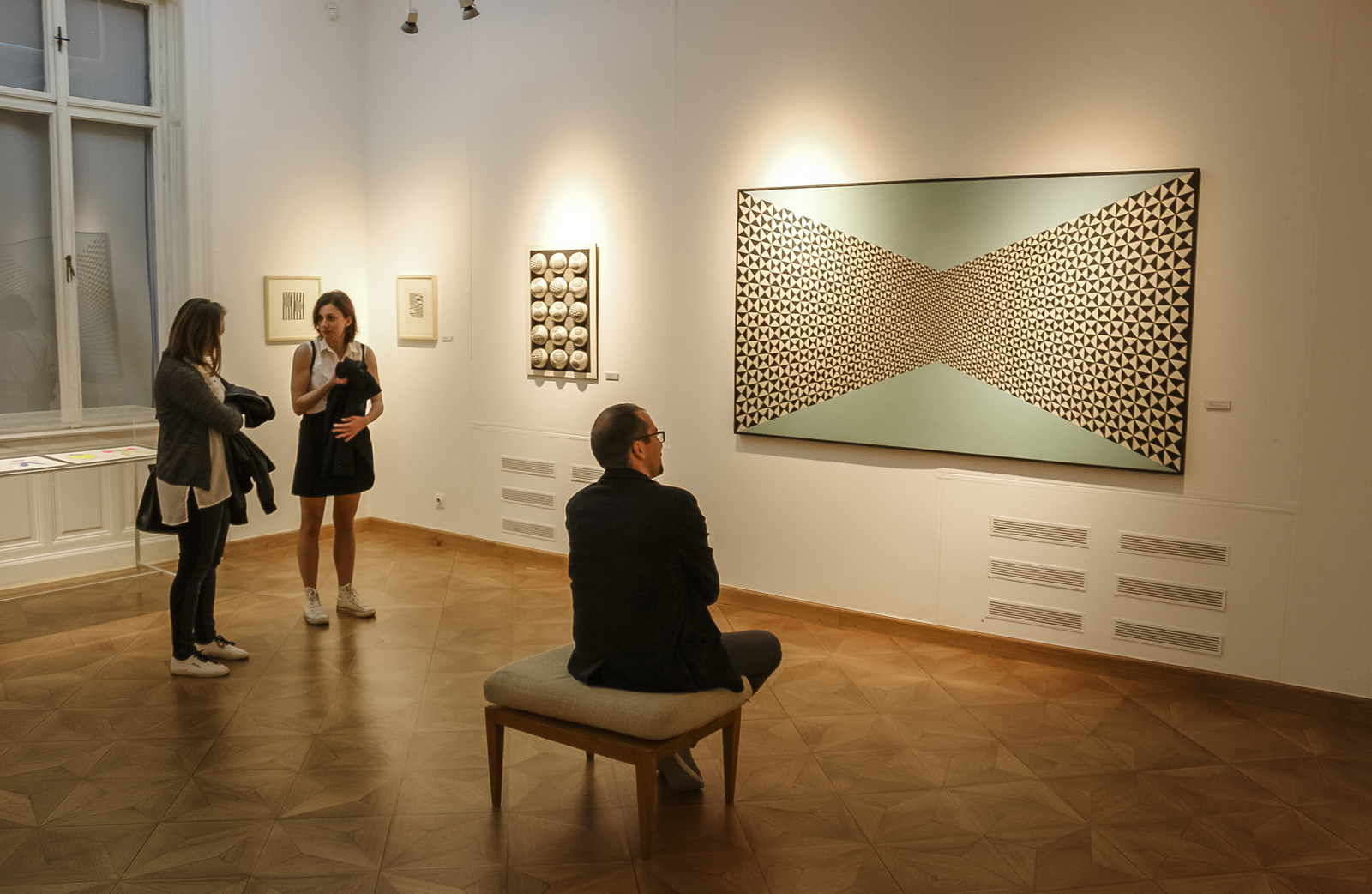

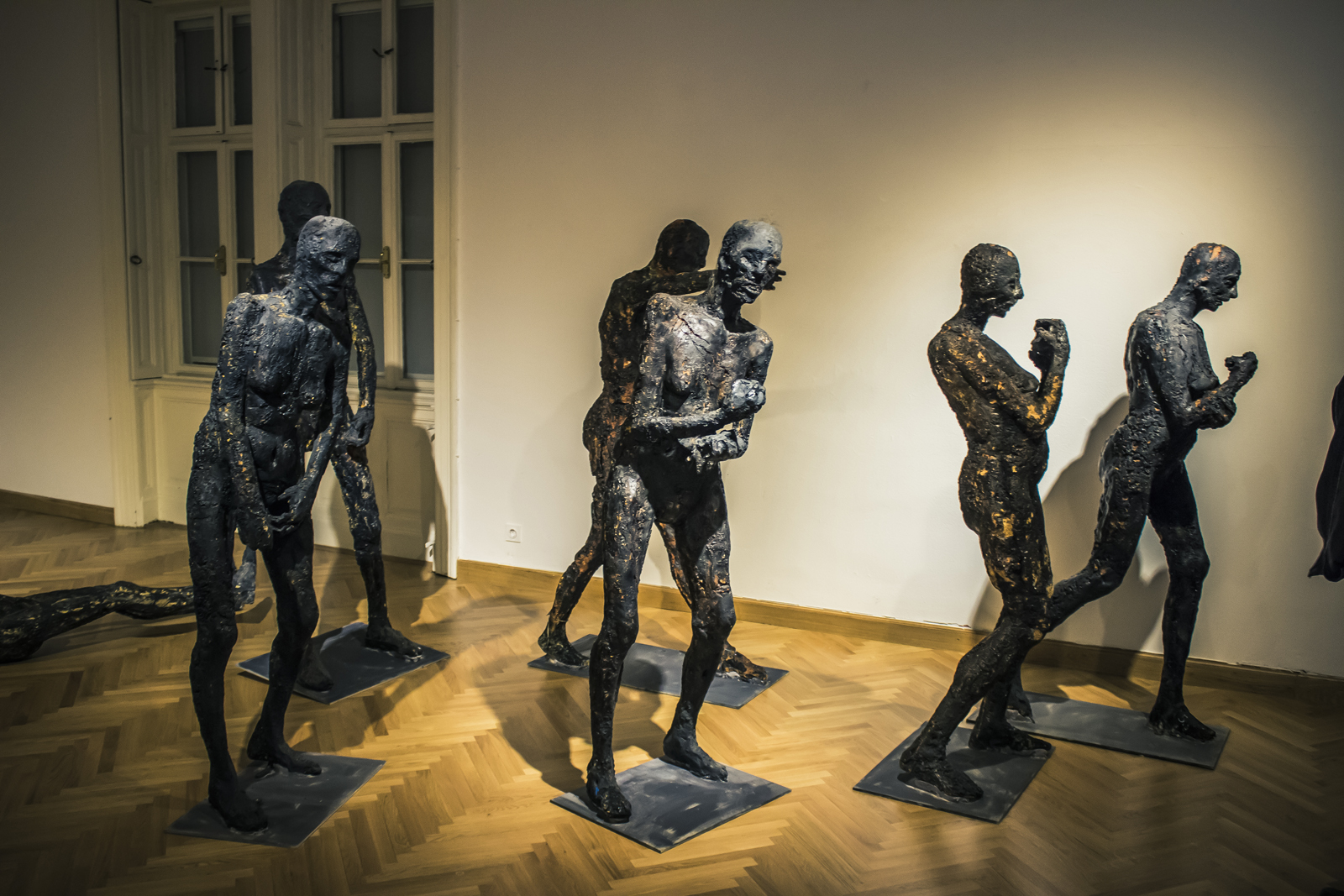

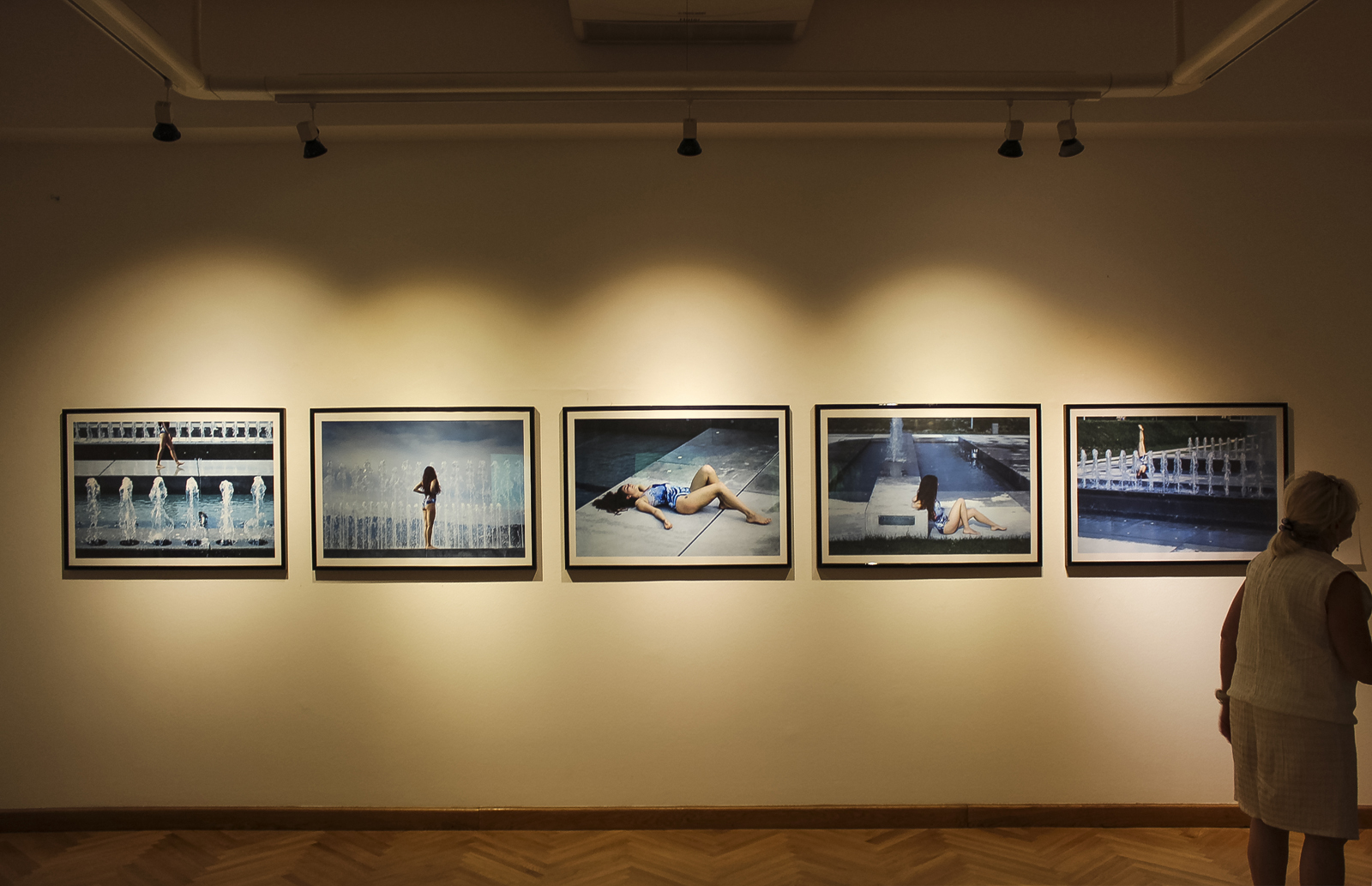

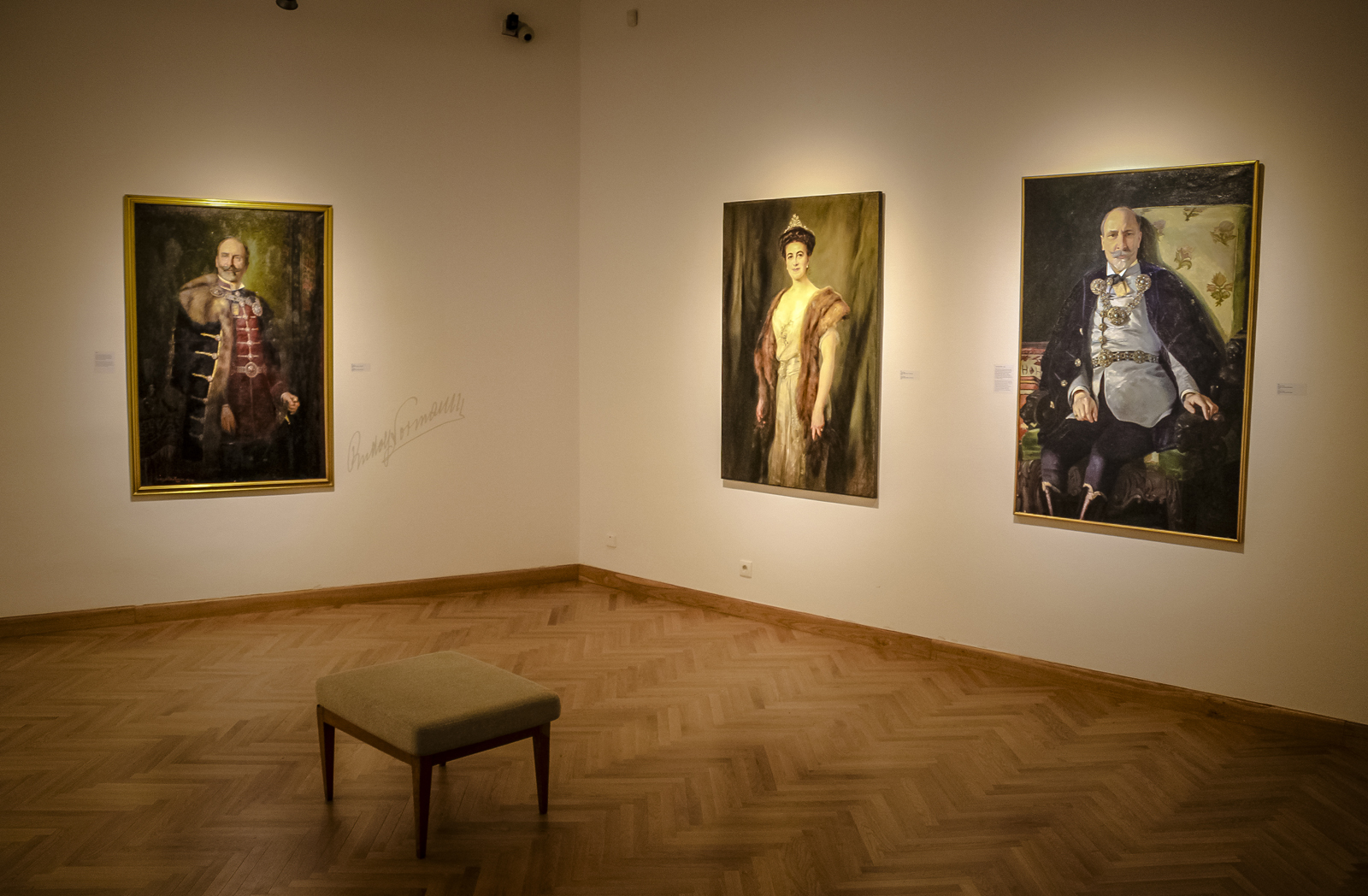

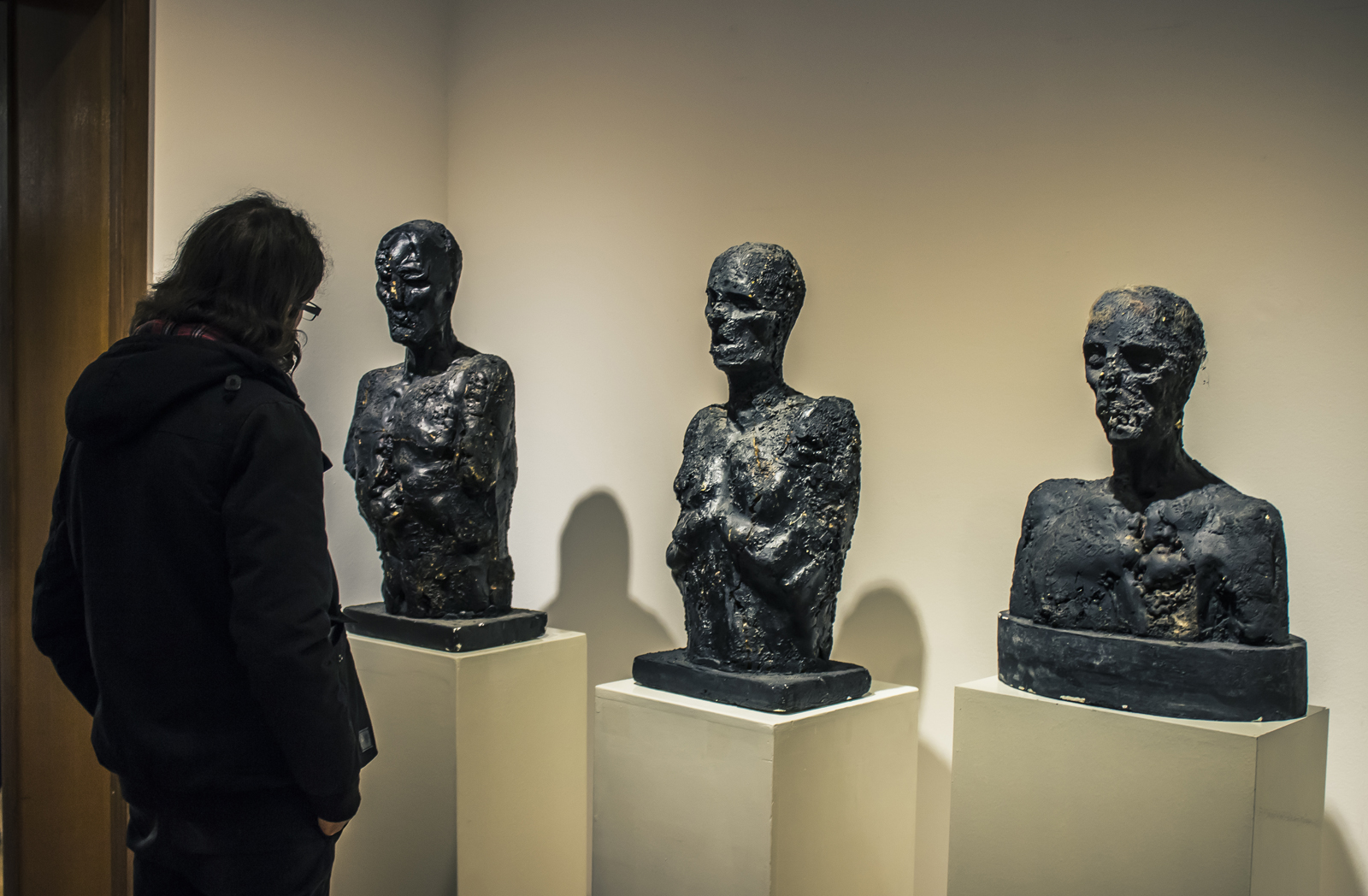

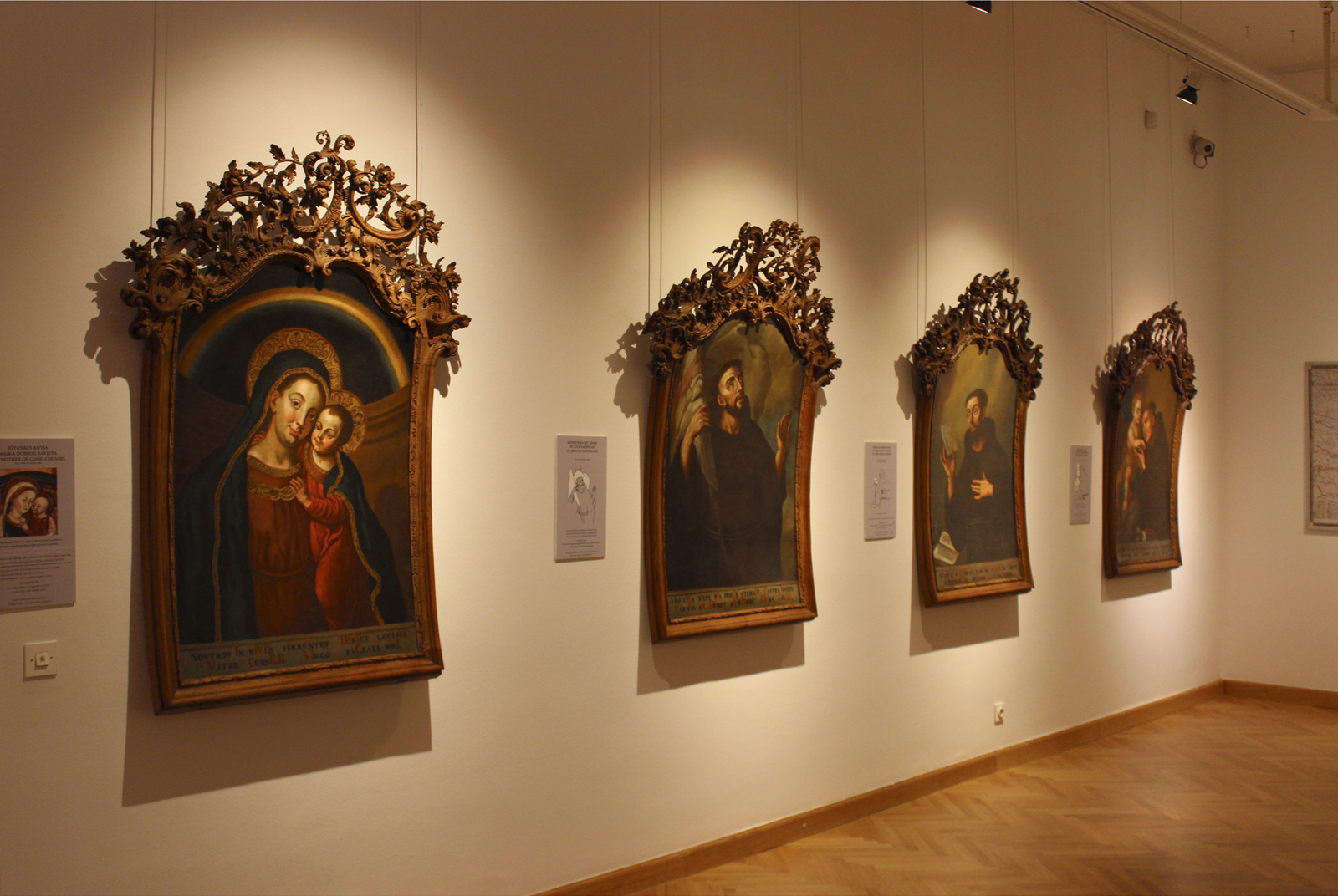

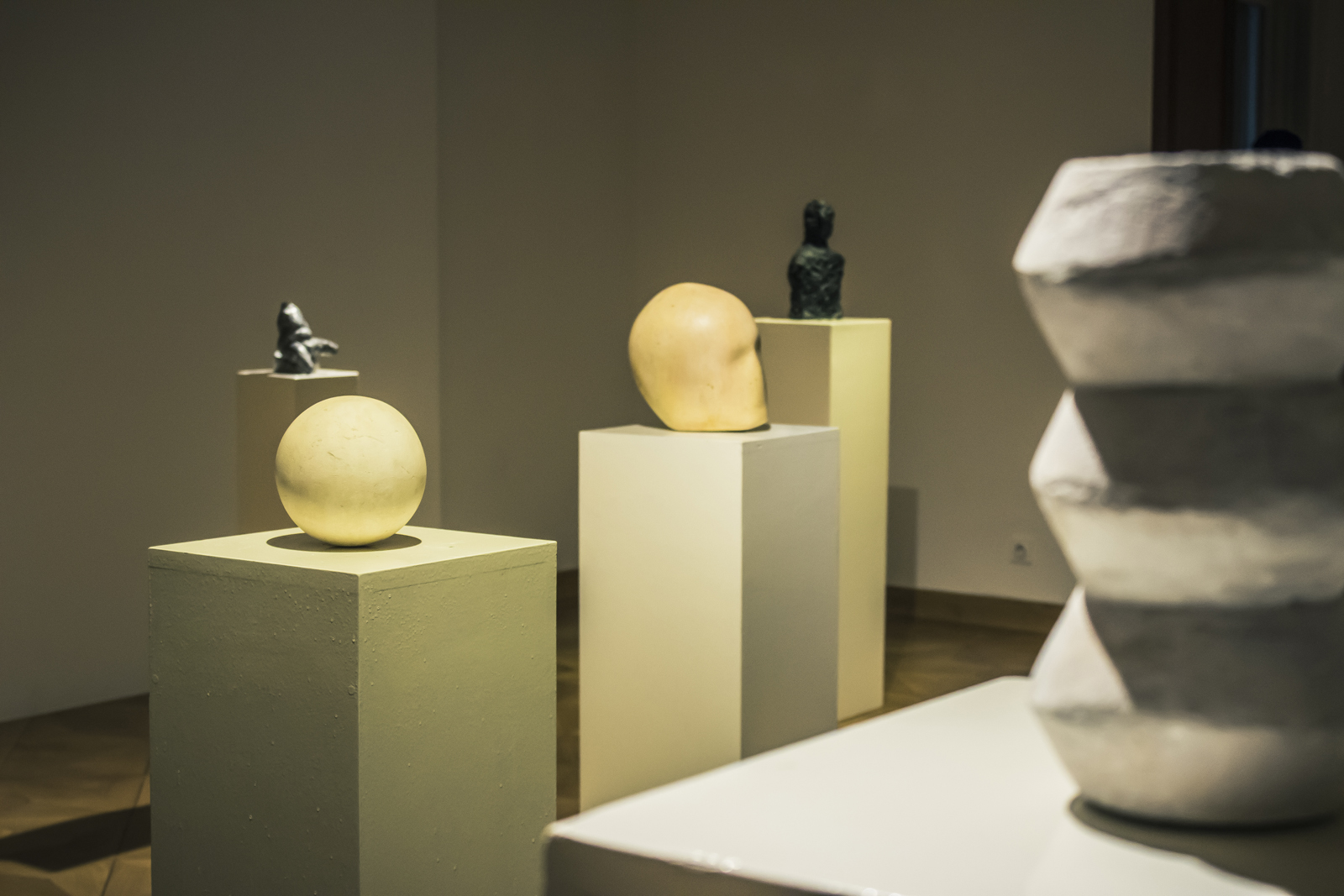

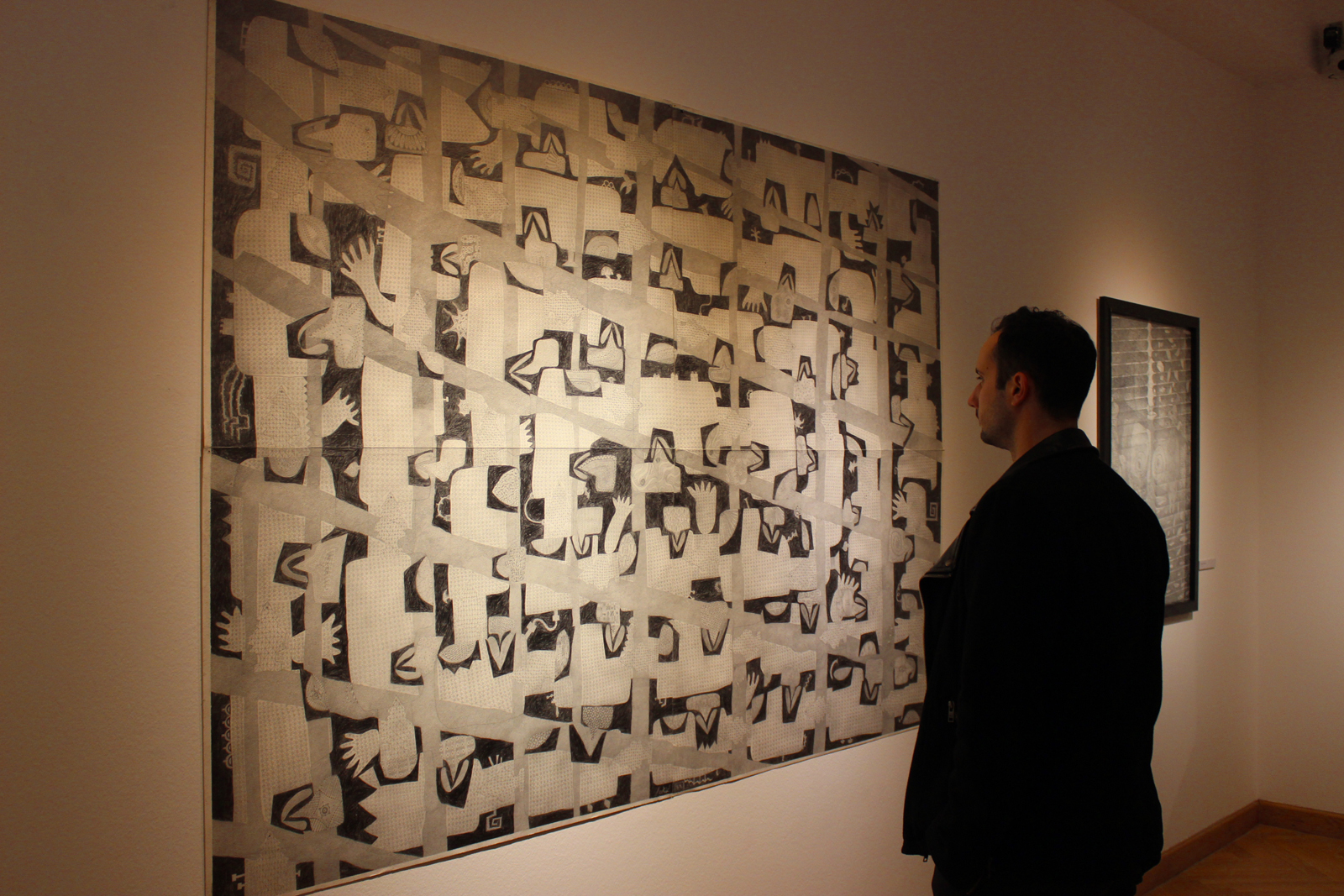

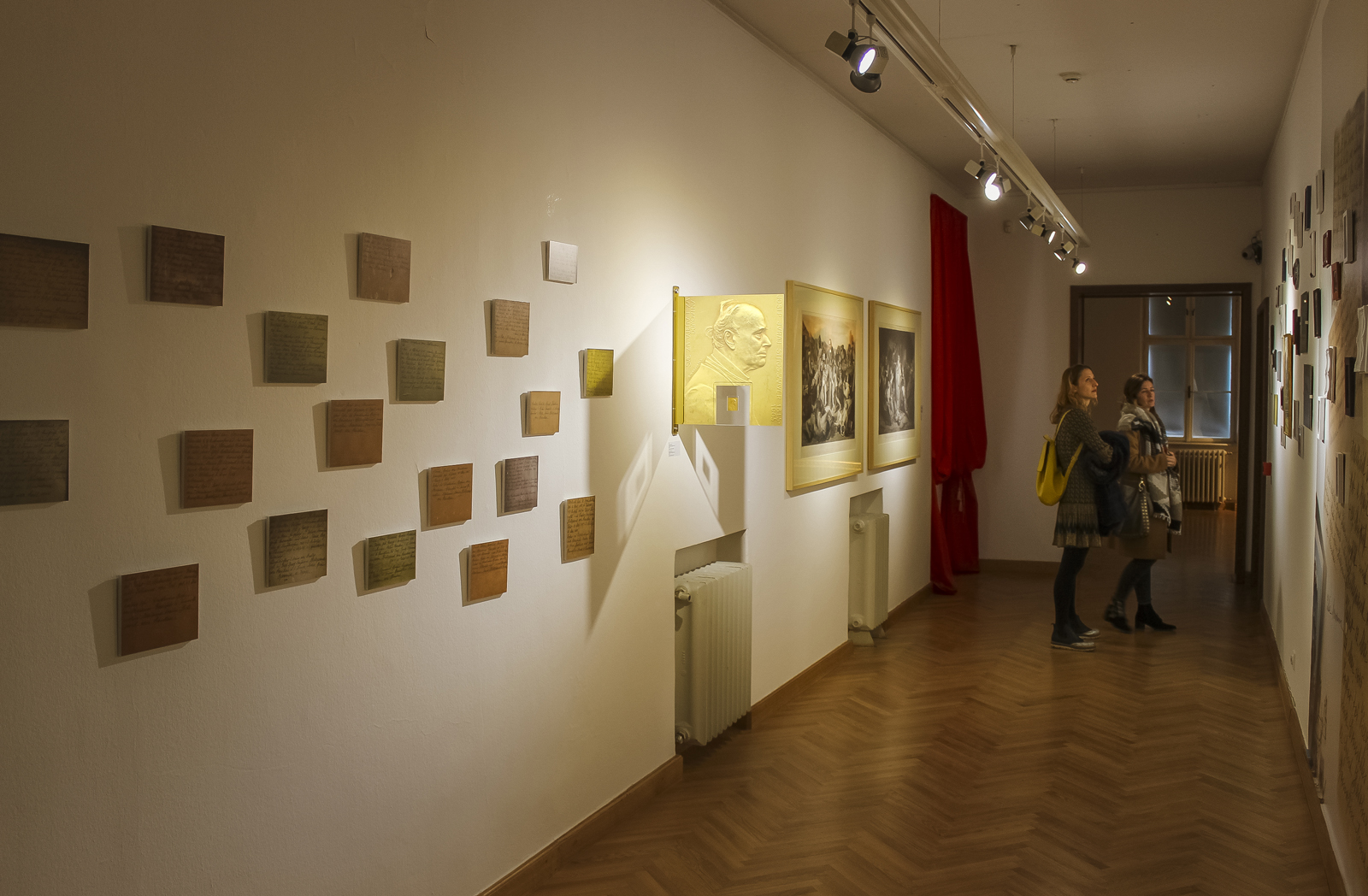

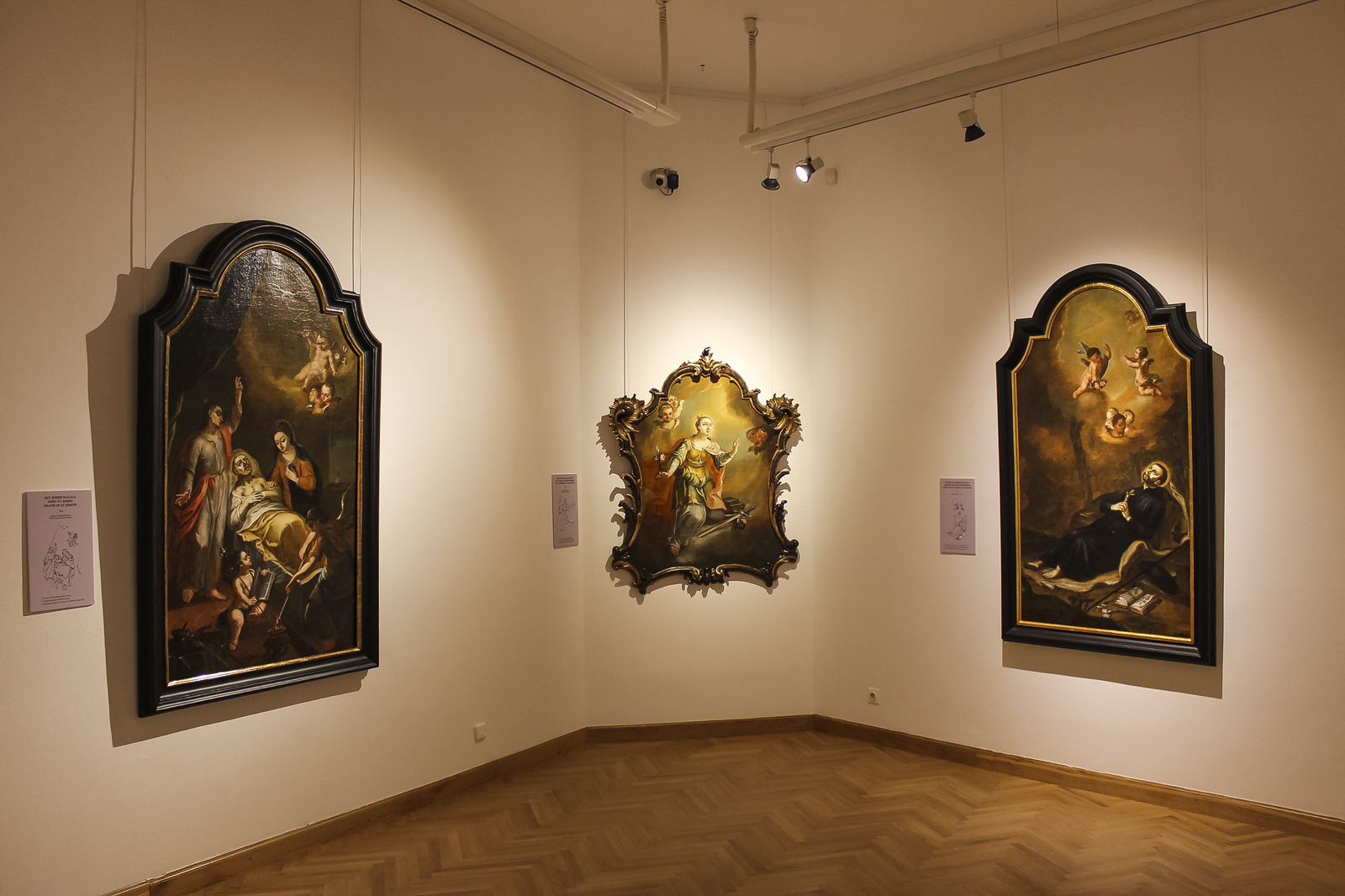

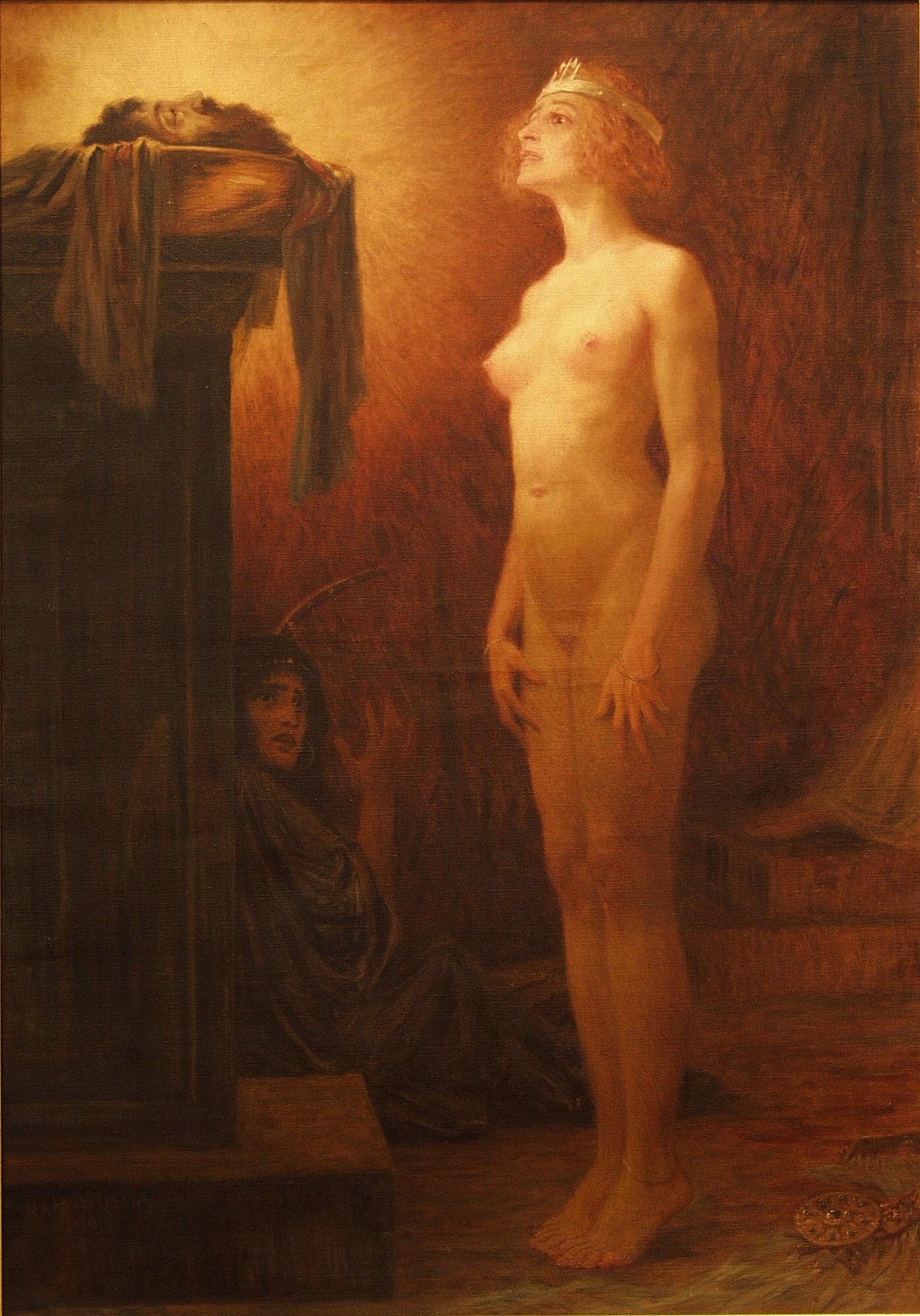
